= LZA =

LZA or variant may refer to:

- ".LZA", a variant of the LHA (file format)
- LZA, a ham radio prefix assigned to Bulgaria, see Amateur radio call signs
- Lanza Air (ICAO airline code: LZA; callsign: AEROLANZA) a Spanish airline, see List of airline codes (L)
- Luiza Airport (IATA airport code: LZA; ICAO airport code: FZUG), Luiza, Kasai-Occidental Province, Democratic Republic of the Congo
- Lža River, a river in Latvia and Pskov Oblast, Russia
- Lake Zoar Authority, an organization for improving safety and water quality on Lake Zoar

== See also ==
- Iaz (disambiguation)
- AZ1 (disambiguation)
- Laz (disambiguation)
- ALZ (disambiguation)
- AZL (disambiguation)
- Zal (disambiguation)
- ZLA, Los Angeles Air Route Traffic Control Center
