= Lazany =

Lažany or Lazany may refer to places:

== Czech Republic ==
- Lažany (Blansko District), a municipality and village in the South Moravian Region
- Lažany (Liberec District), a municipality and village in the Liberec Region
- Lažany (Strakonice District), a municipality and village in the South Bohemian Region
- Lažany, a village and part of Černošín in the Plzeň Region
- Lažany, a village and part of Hrušovany (Chomutov District) in the Ústí nad Labem Region
- Lažany, a village and part of Mezno in the Central Bohemian Region
- Lažany, a village and part of Morašice (Svitavy District) in the Pardubice Region
- Lažany, a village and part of Přestavlky (Plzeň-South District) in the Plzeň Region
- Lažany, a village and part of Radenín in the South Bohemian Region
- Lažany, a village and part of Skuteč in the Pardubice Region
- Lažany, a village and part of Štědrá in the Karlovy Vary Region
- Lažany, a village and part of Vyskeř in the Liberec Region
- Dolní Lažany, a municipality and village in the Vysočina Region

== Slovakia ==
- Lazany, Slovakia, a village in Prievidza District
- Lažany, Slovakia, a village in Prešov District

== Poland ==
- Łażany, Lower Silesian Voivodeship
- Łazany, Lesser Poland Voivodeship
