= 1AZ =

1AZ may refer to:

- Toyota 1AZ
- OneAZ Credit Union

== See also ==
- AZ (disambiguation)
- AZ1 (disambiguation)
- Iaz (disambiguation)
- laz (disambiguation)
