= AZL =

AZL, azl, or variant, may refer to:

- Arizona League, a rookie-level Minor League Baseball summer rookie league based in Arizona
- Africa One (ICAO airline code: AZL; callsign: SKY AFRICA), a defunct Zambian airline; see List of airline codes (A)
- Fazenda Tucunaré Airport (IATA airport code: AZL; ICAO airport code: SWTU), Sapezal, Mato Grosso, Brazil; see List of airports by IATA code: A
- Federal Customs Administration (AZL) of Switzerland, see Swiss Border Guard
- American Z Line (model trains), a company making Z-scale model rail, see Z scale
- 'Azl (Arabic: عزل) the withdrawal method under Islamic jurisprudence
- Anti Zealot League (moderate right wing) activists against extreme zealous protestors

== See also ==
- AZI (disambiguation)
- AZ1 (disambiguation)
- ALZ (disambiguation)
- Laz (disambiguation)
- LZA (disambiguation)
- Zal (disambiguation)
- ZLA, Los Angeles Air Route Traffic Control Center
