= Laže =

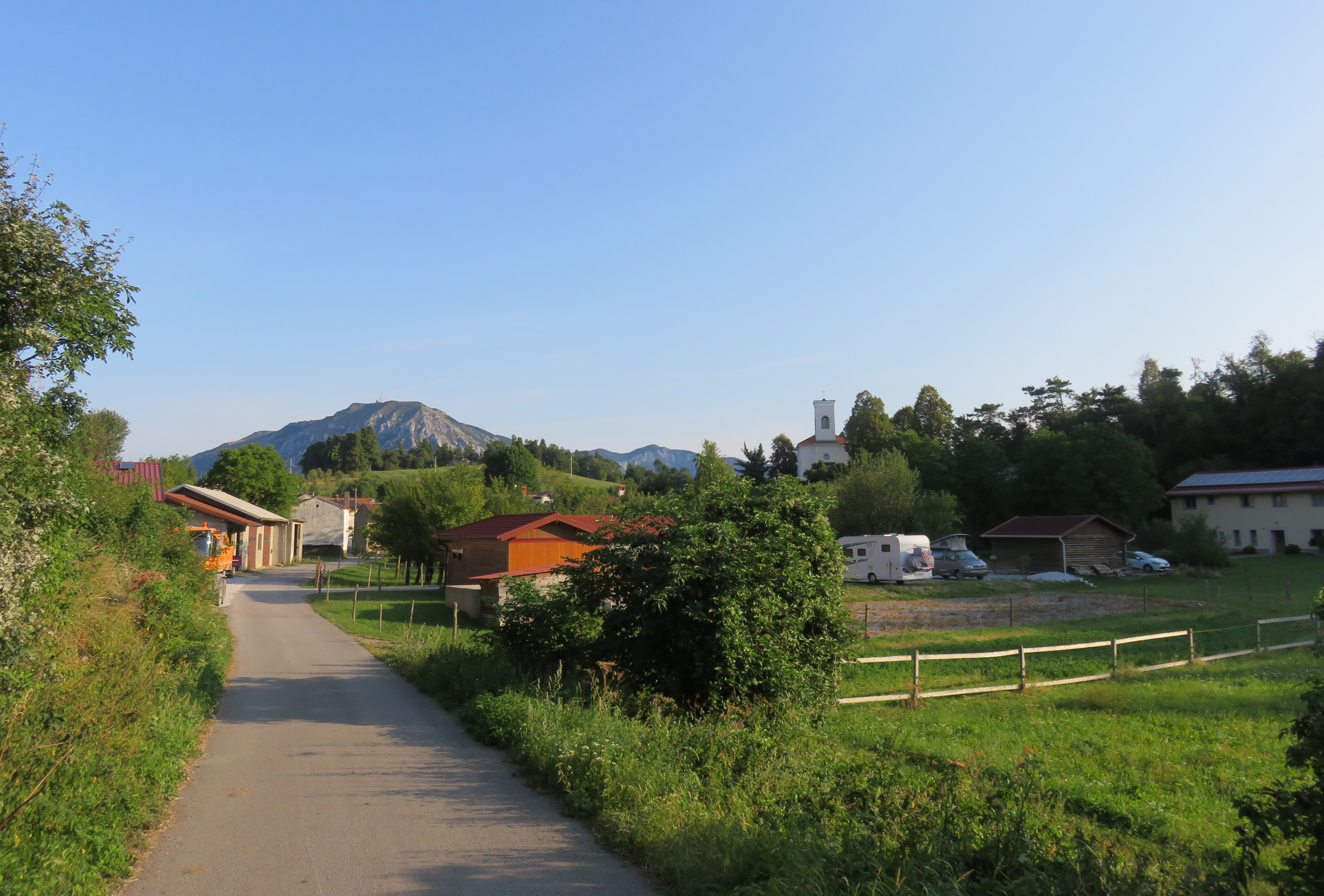

- Location in Slovenia
- Coordinates: 45°44′6″N 14°4′4.82″E
- Country: Slovenia
- Traditional region: Inner Carniola
- Statistical region: Coastal–Karst
- Municipality: Divača

Area
  - Total: 7.51 km^{2} (2.90 sq mi)
- Elevation: 681.3 m (2,235 ft)

Population (2020)
  - Total: 94
  - Density: 13/km^{2} (32/sq mi)

Laže (pronounced [ˈlaːʒɛ], German: Lasche) is a village in the Municipality of Divača in the Littoral region of Slovenia.

== Name ==
The name Laže is derived from the plural demonym *Laz′ane (in turn from the common noun laz 'clearing in or near a woods overgrown with grass'), referring to people living in a clearing. It is thus related to the Slovak toponym Lažany and Czech Lažany, as well as to names such as Laz, Lazi, and Laze.

== History ==
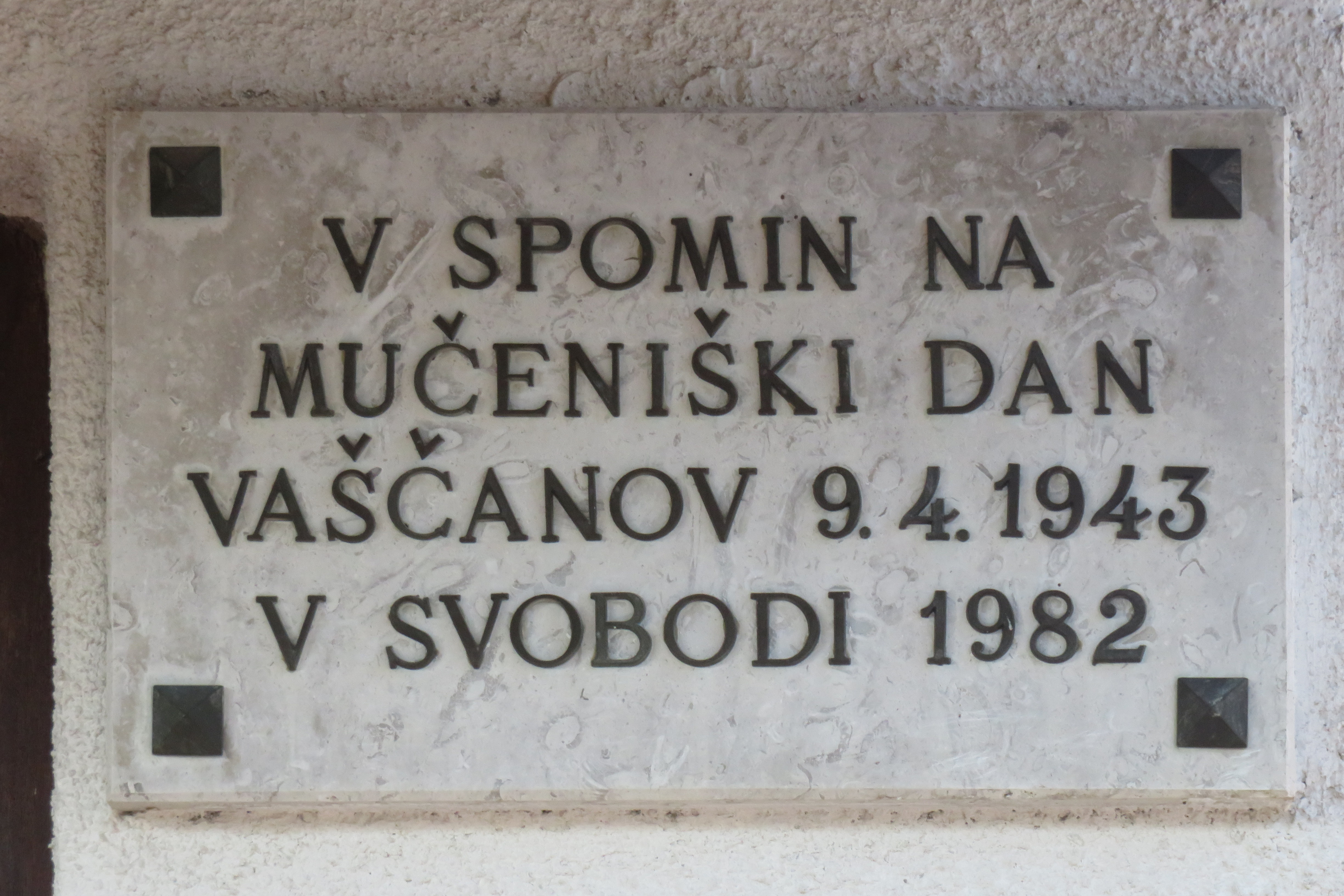
Plaque in Laže commemorating the 1943 eviction

The first settlers came to Laže from Lipica in the 17th century, when the bishops of Trieste sold the territory in Lipica to the Austrian court; the farmers in Lipica were then evicted from their land and provided with substitute land in Laže. Seven families moved to Laže at that time and made their living as charcoal burners.

Ponds were formerly maintained in Laže for cutting ice for the brewery in Senožeče. After the brewery closed down, the ponds were allowed to dry up.

During the Second World War, Laže was a center of Partisan activity, and so Italian forces evicted the population of the village in April 1943. The villagers returned in 1944, and German forces burned two houses in Laže before the end of the war.

== Church ==
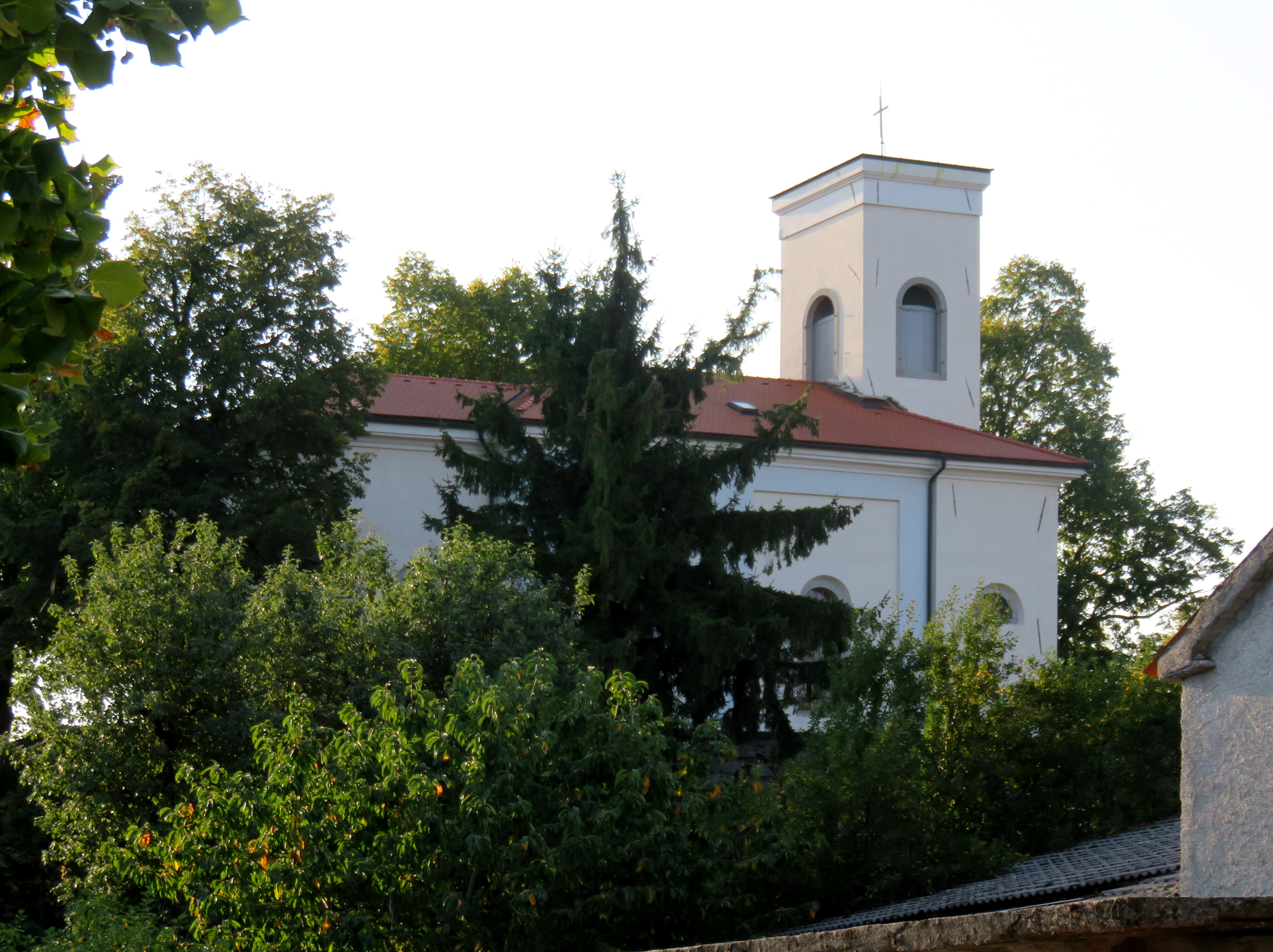
Saint Ulrich's Church

The local church is dedicated to Saint Ulrich and belongs to the Parish of Senožeče.
