= Azi =

Azi or AZI may refer to:

== People ==
- Azi (scribe), a scribe from the ancient kingdom of Ebla
- Azi Aslanov, an Azerbaijani major-general during World War II
- Azi Shahril Azmi, a Malaysian footballer
- Azi Paybarah, a New York-based journalist

== Other uses ==
- Azi (Romanian newspaper)
- Azi (clone), a term for human clones in C. J. Cherryh's science fiction universe
- AZI-3, a medical droid from Kamino in Star Wars: The Clone Wars
- Al Bateen Executive Airport (IATA: AZI), United Arab Emirates

== See also ==
- Azis (disambiguation)
- AZL (disambiguation)
- AZ1 (disambiguation)
- AZI1 (gene)
- Al-'Azi (אל עזי), Israel; an Arab village
- AIZ (disambiguation)
