= Lazul River =

Lazul River may refer to:

- Lazul, a tributary of the Latorița in Vâlcea County
- Lazul, a tributary of the Teregova in Caraș-Severin County

== See also ==
- Laz (river)
- Lazu River (disambiguation)
