= Lazy River (disambiguation) =

(Up A) Lazy River is a 1930 song by Hoagy Carmichael and Sidney Arodin.

Lazy River may also refer to:

- Lazy river, a water park ride
- Lazy River (film), a 1934 American film directed by George B. Seitz

== See also ==
- Lazy Branch
- Lazu River (disambiguation)
