= A-Z =

A-Z or A to Z may refer to:

- The English alphabet
- A–Z (album), by Colin Newman
- A to Z (TV series), 2014 American television series on NBC
- A to Z, or Geographers' A–Z Street Atlas
- A-Z, collection of sportswear made in collaboration with the Swedish footballer Zlatan Ibrahimović
- Geographers' A–Z Map Company, British map publisher

== See also ==
- A2Z (disambiguation)
- AZ (disambiguation)
- Hyundai Atos, also called Hyundai Atoz, a city car
