= USP9X =

Protein-coding gene in the species Homo sapiens

Identifiers
- Aliases: USP9X, DFFRX, FAF, FAM, MRX99, MRXS99F, ubiquitin specific peptidase 9, X-linked, ubiquitin specific peptidase 9 X-linked, XLID99
- External IDs: OMIM: 300072; MGI: 894681; GeneCards: USP9X
Enzyme activity
| EC # | BRENDA | ExPASy | KEGG | MetaCyc |
|---|---|---|---|---|
| 3.4.19.12 | ↗ | ↗ | ↗ | ↗ |

Gene location (Human)
| Chr. | X chromosome (human) |
| Band | Xp11.4 | Start | 41,085,445 bp |
| Band | Xp11.4 | End | 41,236,579 bp |

Gene location (Mouse)
| Chr. | X chromosome (mouse) |
| Band | X A1.1|X 7.95 cM | Start | 12,937,737 bp |
| Band | X A1.1|X 7.95 cM | End | 13,039,567 bp |
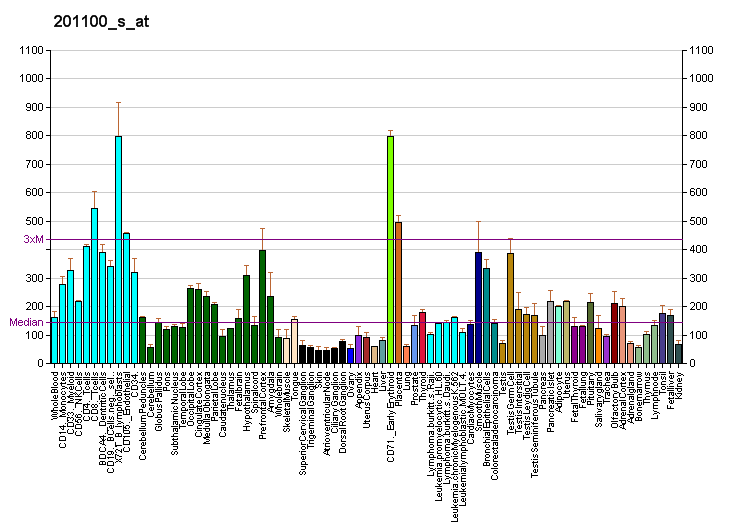

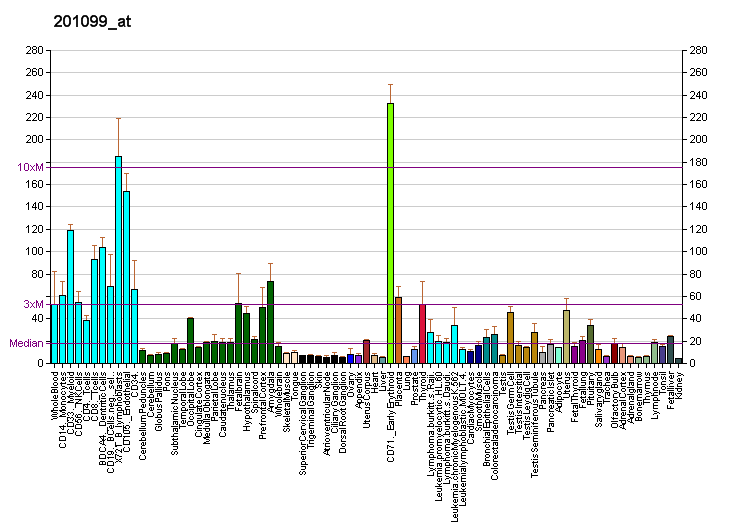
RNA expression pattern
| Bgee | Human / Mouse (ortholog); Top expressed in: middle frontal gyrus; secondary oocyte; paraflocculus of cerebellum; Skeletal muscle tissue of rectus abdominis; jejunum; pars reticulata; jejunal mucosa; trabecular bone; frontal pole; lateral nuclear group of thalamus / Top expressed in: secondary oocyte; genital tubercle; zygote; substantia nigra; tail of embryo; dentate gyrus of hippocampal formation granule cell; pineal gland; ventricular zone; triceps brachii muscle; primary visual cortex; More reference expression data |
| BioGPS | More reference expression data |
Gene ontology
| Molecular function | cysteine-type peptidase activity; co-SMAD binding; peptidase activity; protein binding; cysteine-type endopeptidase activity; hydrolase activity; thiol-dependent deubiquitinase; deubiquitinase activity; Lys48-specific deubiquitinase activity |
| Cellular component | cytoplasm; cytosol; cell projection; membrane; growth cone |
| Biological process | female gamete generation; ubiquitin-dependent protein catabolic process; chromosome segregation; neuron migration; negative regulation of transcription by RNA polymerase II; BMP signaling pathway; proteolysis; cell division; axon extension; cell cycle; transforming growth factor beta receptor signaling pathway; protein ubiquitination; protein deubiquitination; protein targeting to peroxisome; regulation of circadian rhythm; rhythmic process; protein stabilization; protein K48-linked deubiquitination; protein deubiquitination involved in ubiquitin-dependent protein catabolic process; positive regulation of DNA demethylation |
Sources:Amigo / QuickGO
Orthologs
| Databases | NCBI: entry; OMA: entry |
| Species | Human | Mouse |
| Entrez | 8239 | 22284 |
| Ensembl | ENSG00000124486 | ENSMUSG00000031010 |
| UniProt | Q93008 | P70398 |
| RefSeq (mRNA) | NM_001039590; NM_001039591; NM_004652; NM_021906 | NM_009481 |
| RefSeq (protein) | NP_001034679; NP_001034680 | NP_033507 |
| Location (UCSC) | Chr X: 41.09 – 41.24 Mb | Chr X: 12.94 – 13.04 Mb |
| PubMed search |
- Wikidata
| View/Edit Human | View/Edit Mouse |

Probable ubiquitin carboxyl-terminal hydrolase FAF-X is an enzyme that in humans is encoded by the USP9X gene.

== Gene ==
This gene is a member of the peptidase C19 family and encodes a protein that is similar to ubiquitin-specific proteases. Though this gene is located on the X chromosome, it escapes X-inactivation.

== Function ==
Depletion of USP9X from two-cell mouse embryos halts blastocyst development and results in slower blastomere cleavage rate, impaired cell adhesion and a loss of cell polarity. It has also been implicated that USP9X is likely to influence developmental processes through signaling pathways of Notch, Wnt, EGF, and mTOR. USP9X has been recognized in studies of mouse and human stem cells involving embryonic, neural and hematopoietic stem cells. High expression is retained in undifferentiated progenitor and stem cells and decreases as differentiation continues. USP9X is a protein-coding gene that has been implicated either directly through mutations or indirectly in a number of neurodevelopmental and neurodegenerative disorders.

In a knockout model where hippocampal neurons were isolated from an USP9X-knockout male mouse, showed a 43% reduction in axonal length and arborization compared to wild type.

== Clinical significance ==
Three mutations have been connected with X-linked intellectual disability through disrupted neuronal growth and cell migration. Neurodegenerative disorders, such as Alzheimer's, Parkinson's and Huntington's disease, have also been linked to USP9X. Specifically, USP9X has been implicated in the regulation of the phosphorylation and expression of the microtule-associated protein tau, which forms pathological aggregates in Alzheimer's and other tauopathies.

=== USP9X syndrome ===
Variants of the USP9X gene have been found to cause a neurodevelopmental USP9X syndrome in both males and females. USP9X is strongly evolutionarily conserved in humans and is intolerant to variation. This is due to the important role of the USP9X enzyme, which reverses protein ubiquitylation, thereby decreasing the enzymatic degradation and increasing the longevity of those proteins. Being on the X chromosome, USP9X syndrome manifests differently in females compared to males. In females, loss of function variations in one copy of the gene results in haploinsufficiency. This is because USP9X escapes the usually-protective process of X-inactivation. As a result, even "carrier" females exhibit the syndrome.

Variants found in females with USP9X syndrome include whole or partial deletions of one copy of the USP9X gene, as well as mis-sense mutations or small in-frame deletion mutations. Symptoms in females include intellectual disability, facial dysmorphia, and language impairment. Less common symptoms include short stature, scoliosis, polydactyly, and changes to dentition. Females have a wider range of symptoms than males, likely due to their wider variety of USP9X gene variants compared to males. Other symptoms sometimes found in females but rarely or never in males include hip dysplasia, heart dysmorphia, hearing problems and abnormal skin pigmentation.

USP9X variants seen in surviving males cause loss of function in brain-specific processes only, since total loss of function of this gene is fatal in the embryonic stage. Males are hemizygous for this gene because they possess only one X chromosome. Symptoms seen in affected males include intellectual disability, problems with language, speech, behaviour and sight, and facial dysmorphia. Specific brain abnormalities include white matter disturbances, a thin corpus callosum, and widened ventricles.

== Interactions ==
USP9X has been shown to interact with:

- Beta-catenin
- MARK4
- MLLT4
- NUAK1
- ERG
- CEP131
