= MTCL3 =

Protein-coding gene in humans

Identifiers
- Aliases: MTCL3, C6orf174, dJ403A15.3, SOGA family member 3, SOGA3, MTCL family member 3
- External IDs: MGI: 1914662; GeneCards: MTCL3

Gene location (Human)
Chr.	Chromosome 6 (human)
Band	6q22.33	Start	127,472,794 bp
Band	6q22.33	End	127,519,191 bp

Gene location (Mouse)
Chr.	Chromosome 10 (mouse)
Band	10|10 A4	Start	29,019,835 bp
Band	10|10 A4	End	29,075,626 bp
RNA expression pattern
Bgee	Human / Mouse (ortholog); Top expressed in: ganglionic eminence; ventricular zone; gonad; sural nerve; prefrontal cortex; testicle; corpus callosum; islet of Langerhans; stromal cell of endometrium; C1 segment / Top expressed in: Rostral migratory stream; ganglionic eminence; tail of embryo; olfactory bulb; cingulate gyrus; lumbar spinal ganglion; superior frontal gyrus; lateral septal nucleus; anterior horn of spinal cord; anterior amygdaloid area; More reference expression data
BioGPS	n/a
Orthologs
Databases	NCBI: entry; OMA: entry
Species	Human	Mouse
Entrez	387104	67412
Ensembl	ENSG00000214338	ENSMUSG00000038916
UniProt	Q5TF21	Q6NZL0
RefSeq (mRNA)	NM_001012279	NM_026138
RefSeq (protein)	NP_001012279	NP_080414
Location (UCSC)	Chr 6: 127.47 – 127.52 Mb	Chr 10: 29.02 – 29.08 Mb
PubMed search
- Wikidata
View/Edit Human	View/Edit Mouse

Microtubule cross-linking factor 3 is a protein in humans that is encoded by the MTCL3 gene (previously SOGA3). In contrast to its paralogs MTCL1 and MTCL2, not much has been reported about the function of this protein, but it may be involved in autophagy. It has also been known as suppressor of glucose, autophagy associated 3 (SOGA3).
