= Lažany (Strakonice District) =

- Municipality
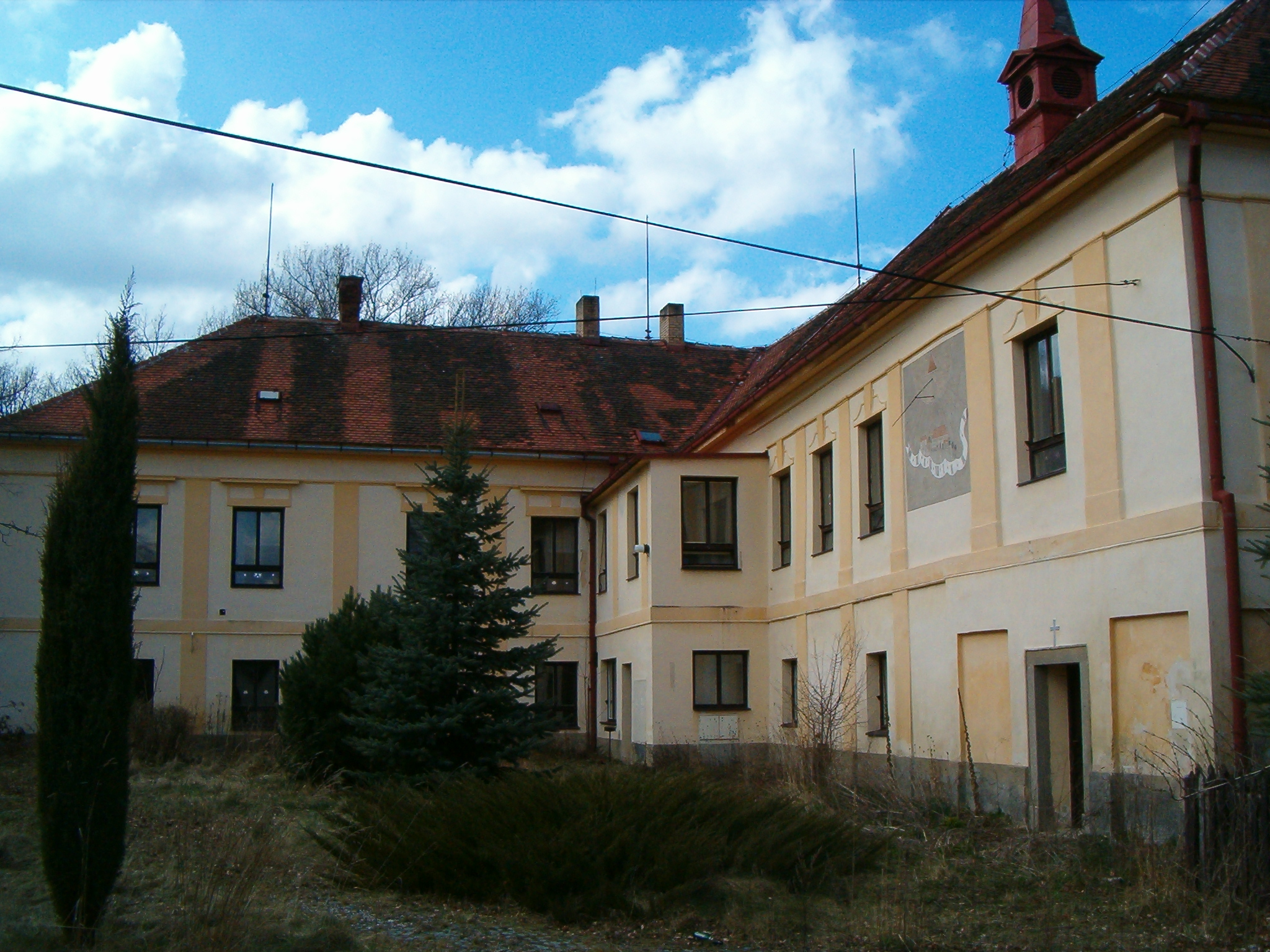
- Lažany Castle

- Location in the Czech Republic
- Coordinates: 49°21′47″N 13°52′59″E
- Country: Czech Republic
- Region: South Bohemian
- District: Strakonice
- First mentioned: 1384

Area
  - Total: 3.23 km^{2} (1.25 sq mi)
- Elevation: 506 m (1,660 ft)

Population (2026-01-01)
  - Total: 55
  - Density: 17/km^{2} (44/sq mi)
- Time zone: UTC+1 (CET)
  - Summer (DST): UTC+2 (CEST)
- Postal code: 388 01
- Website: www.obeclazany.cz

Lažany is a municipality and village in Strakonice District in the South Bohemian Region of the Czech Republic. It has about 60 inhabitants.

Lažany lies approximately 12 kilometres (7 mi) north of Strakonice, 61 km (38 mi) north-west of České Budějovice, and 90 km (56 mi) south-west of Prague.

== Etymology ==
The name means "the village of Lažans", which can be translated either as "the village of people who settled on láz (an Old Czech word meaning 'field' or 'land')" or "the village of people who came from a place called Láz".

== Demographics ==
Historical population
Year	Pop.	±%
1869	372	—
1880	283	−23.9%
1890	224	−20.8%
1900	217	−3.1%
1910	235	+8.3%
1921	240	+2.1%
1930	174	−27.5%
1950	125	−28.2%
1961	208	+66.4%
1970	179	−13.9%
1980	151	−15.6%
1991	124	−17.9%
2001	131	+5.6%
2011	60	−54.2%
2021	51	−15.0%
Source: Censuses
