= Atanasie Anghel =

Romanian Greek-Catholic bishop of Alba Iulia between 1698 and 1713

Atanasie Anghel Popa
- Primate of the Romanian Greek Catholic Church
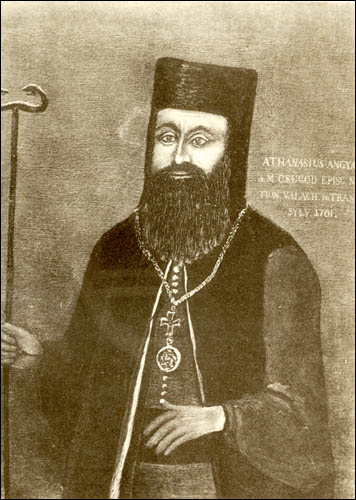
- Church: Romanian Greek Catholic Church
- Diocese: Diocese of Alba Iulia
- Installed: 22 January 1698
- Term ended: 19 August 1713
- Predecessor: Teophilus Seremi
- Successor: Ioan Giurgiu Patachi

Personal details
- Born: Bábolna
- Died: August 19, 1713 Gyulafehérvár
- Buried: Cathedral of the Holy Trinity, Blaj

Atanasie Anghel Popa (died 19 August 1713) was a Romanian Greek-Catholic bishop of Gyulafehérvár (today Alba Iulia, Romania) between 1698 and 1713. He was the successor to Teophilus Seremi in the seat of the Bălgrad Metropolitanate. Through his continued efforts, he perfected the union of the Romanians living in Transylvania and other parts of Hungary with the Catholic Church.

== Life ==
He was born in Bábolna (today Bobâlna, part of Rapoltu Mare, Hunedoara County, Romania), the son of an Orthodox priest from Nagyrápolt (today Rapoltu Mare) who was a nobleman of Maroscsüged (today Ciugud, Romania).

Anghel was ordained bishop on 22 January 1698, by Eastern Orthodox Metropolitan Teodosius (1620–1708), Primate of the Metropolitan diocese of Ungro-Wallachia and by Patriarch of Jerusalem Dositheos II (1641–1707), who was in exile.

Patriarch Dositheos II also asked Bishop Atanasie Anghel to listen to both the Greek hierarchs from the court of voivode Constantin Brâncoveanu, who supervised the work of the Romanian hierarchs and the Transylvanian Calvinist hierarchy.

== First synod of Gyulafehérvár ==
On 7 October 1698 he convened the "Union Synod" in Gyulafehérvár. The Act of Union with the Catholic Church was signed not only by Anghel, but by all members of the Synod (38 district protopopes and 2,270 priests), and sealed with the seal of the Metropolitan Archbishopric of Gyulafehérvár (Mitropolia Bălgradului in old Romanian language). The Transylvanian Diet, controlled by Protestants, did not look favorably upon the confessional issues of the Romanian people. Large land holders began to persecute the new Romanian Greek-Catholic priests, a situation which Atanasie Anghel had to cope with. Protestant noblemen encouraged revolts among peasants opposed to joining the Catholic Church.

Under these circumstances, the bishop Atanasie Anghel convened a new synod, also held at Gyulafehérvár on 4 September 1700. This was attended not only by protopopes and priests, but also by three laymen delegates from each Romanian inhabited village. The 54 protopopes, together with the priests and all the delegations present, signed a new act which reinforced the decision of the synod of 1698, reaffirming religious unification of Romanians in Transylvania with the Catholic Church.

For Greek-Catholic bishop Atanasie Anghel, there followed years of hardship, being attacked by Calvinists and also by the Orthodox Archdiocese of Bucharest. He was summoned to Vienna to give explanations. Under these circumstances, on 7 April 1701 he made a statement that he no longer recognized the Archbishop of Bucharest as his superior.

Under Bishop Atanasie's leadership, the Romanian Greek Catholic Church backed the Habsburg Imperial troops against the kurucs, during Rakoczi's War of Independence.

== Business activities ==
Metropolitan Athanasius was accused several times of carrying out commercial activities. Fifteen years before joining Rome he bought a house in Gyulafehérvár where he brewed beer and wine. In 1703, after the union with Rome, he was summoned to cease this activity, considered incompatible with the status of bishop. In 1711, he still earned income from beer production.

== Death ==
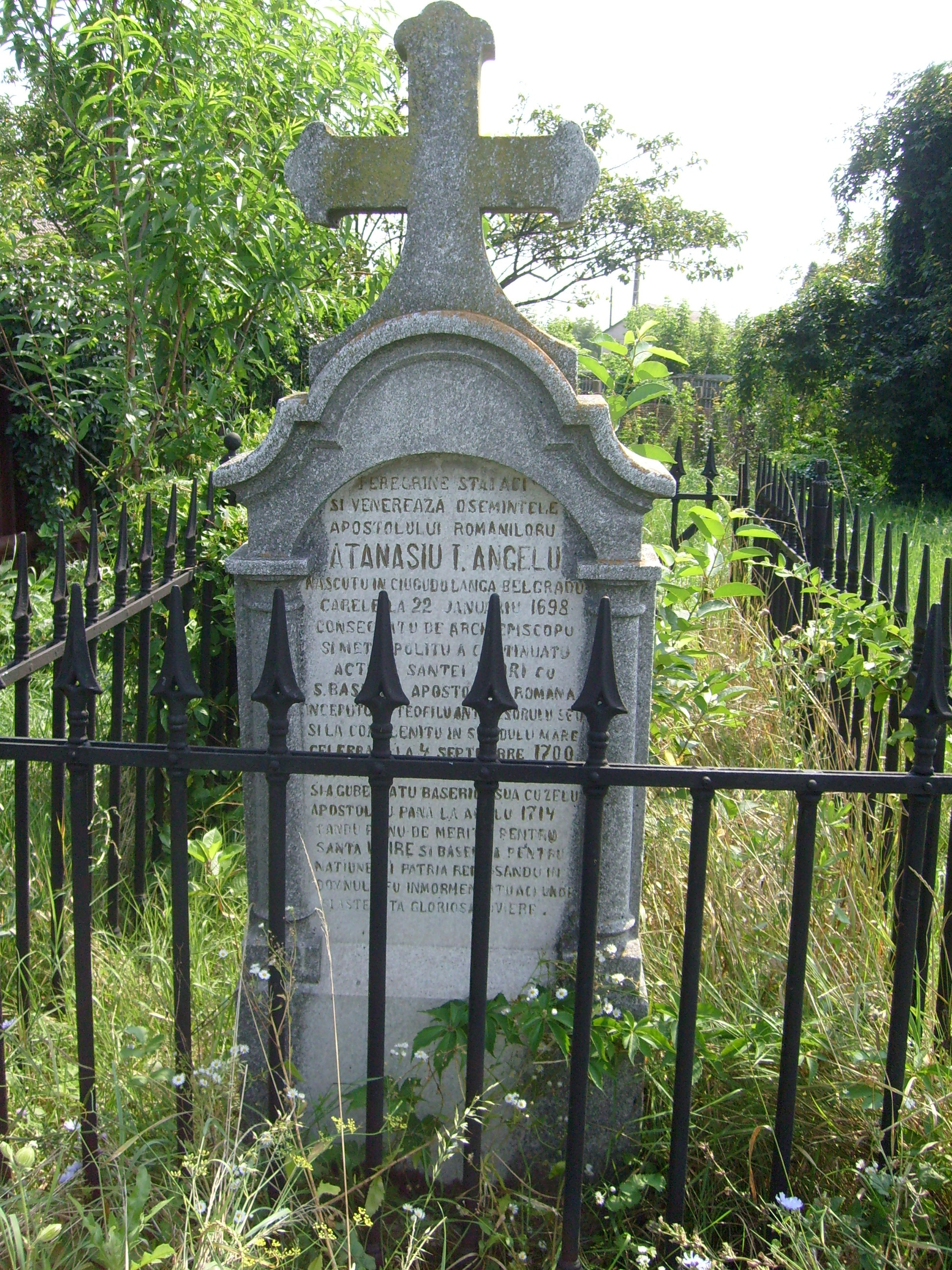
Anghel's tomb, Maieri Church, Alba Iulia

Anghel died in Gyulafehérvár on 19 August 1713, and was buried near the old church of the Bălgrad Metropolitanate (built by the ruler Michael the Brave). Subsequently, with the construction of the Alba Carolina Citadel, the old church was demolished, and the tomb of Atanasie was moved to the cemetery near the Holy Trinity Church in Gyulafehérvár.

In 2013, the remains of Atanasie Anghel were moved to the Cathedral of the Holy Trinity, Blaj.

== Literature ==
- Octavian Bârlea: "Atanasie, Anghel Popa", in Biographical Encyclopedia on the History of Southeastern Europe. Bd. 1 Munich 1974, pp. 106–108.
- Roman Catholic, Transylvanian, Protestant and Israeli religious archontology. Compiled by György Jakubinyi. Rev. 3 and Exp. edition. Cluj: Verbum. 2010. 58–68. He. ISBN 978-606-8059-25-9.
