= AZ1 =

AZ1, AZ-1, AZ.1, or variation, may refer to:

- Autozam AZ-1, a Kei-car sports car manufactured by Mazda under the Autozam brand
- Casio AZ-1, a keytar polyphonic MIDI keyboard manufactured by Casio
- Sky-Watcher AZ1, an alt-azimuth telescope mount made by Sky-Watcher
- Sony HDR-AZ1, one of the Sony Action Cams

== See also ==
- AZ (disambiguation)
- AZI (disambiguation)
- AZL (disambiguation)
- 1AZ (disambiguation)
