= Azis (disambiguation) =

Azis is a Bulgarian-Romani musician.

Azis, a variant of the name Aziz, may also refer to:

== People ==
=== Given name ===
- Azis Tahir Ajdonati, Albanian politician
- Azis Efendi Gjirokastra, Albanian politician
- Azis Jamman (born 1974), Malaysian politician
- Azis Syamsuddin (born 1970), Indonesian politician
- Abdul Azis Saleh, Indonesian anthropologist

=== Surname ===
- Eszrafiq Azis (born 1986) Malaysian cricketer
- Harry Azhar Azis (born 1956) Indonesian politician
- Idham Azis (born 1963) Indonesian police general

== See also ==
- Aziz (disambiguation)
- Azi (disambiguation)
