= Lipica, Sežana =

Village in Littoral, Slovenia

Lipica
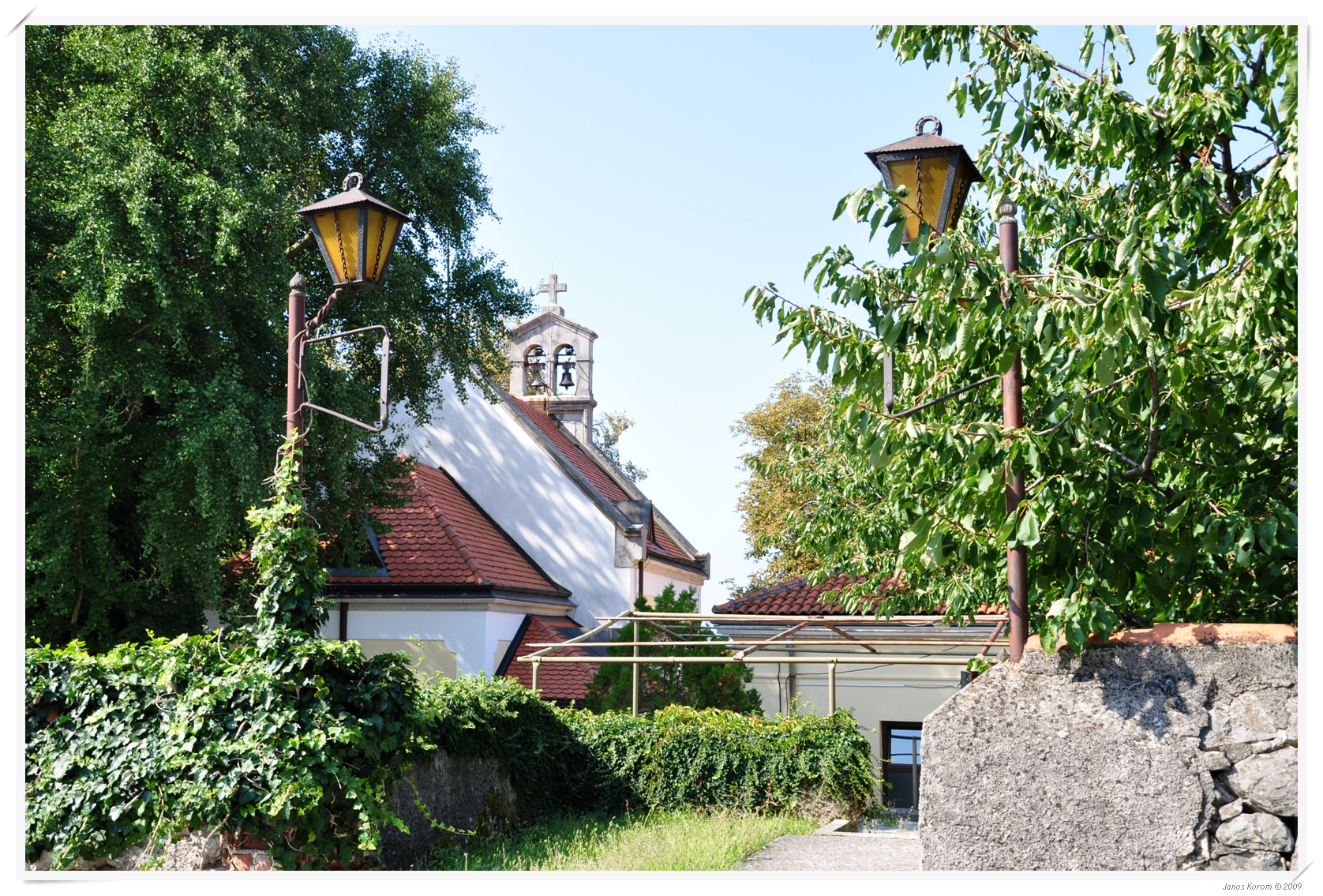
- View towards St. Anthony of Padua Church

- Location in Slovenia
- Coordinates: 45°40′0.96″N 13°52′58.02″E
- Country: Slovenia
- Traditional region: Littoral
- Statistical region: Coastal–Karst
- Municipality: Sežana

Area
  - Total: 10.56 km^{2} (4.08 sq mi)
- Elevation: 396.4 m (1,301 ft)

Population (2002)
  - Total: 93

Lipica (Note: Slovene pronunciation: [ˈliːpitsa]; Italian: Lipizza pronounced [ˈlipittsa]) is a village in the Municipality of Sežana in the Littoral region of Slovenia, close to the border with Italy. Lipica is one of the main tourist centers of Slovenia's Karst region and it is known for the Lipica Stud Farm, the origin of the Lipizzan horse.

== Name ==
The name of the settlement is derived from the Slovene word lipa (< Slavic *li̋pa 'linden tree'). The species is common in the area and is a national symbol of Slovenia. The staff at the Lipica Stud Farm plant a new linden tree for every foal born.

== History ==
From the 14th century until 1947, Lipica was part of the municipality of Trieste. When Charles II, Archduke of Inner Austria (son of Ferdinand I, Holy Roman Emperor) decided to establish a new stud farm in the 16th century, the Spanish horse was considered the ideal horse breed. Because the soil and climate in the Karst region is similar to that of Spain, Lipica was chosen as the perfect spot for the new farm.

The Lipica stud farm was established in 1580 and the first horses were bought from Spain in 1581 (24 broodmares and six stallions). The farmers living in the area at the time were evicted and resettled in Laže.

A coal mine operated east of the settlement from 1778 to 1817. Coal mining was attempted at the site again in 1857 and at sporadic later dates, but was deemed uneconomical because it is deposited only in lenses. Coal from the mine was once used at the sugar refinery in Rijeka. In 1947, Lipica was annexed to Yugoslavia and incorporated into Slovenia, one of the country's constituent republics, which became independent in 1991.

=== Mass grave ===
Lipica is the site of a mass grave associated with the Second World War. The Lipica Shaft Mass Grave (Slovene: Grobišče Lipiško brezno) is located about 500 m (1,600 ft; 550 yd) southwest of the tree-lined boulevard by the stud farm. It contains an undetermined number of human remains.

== Lipica Stud Farm ==
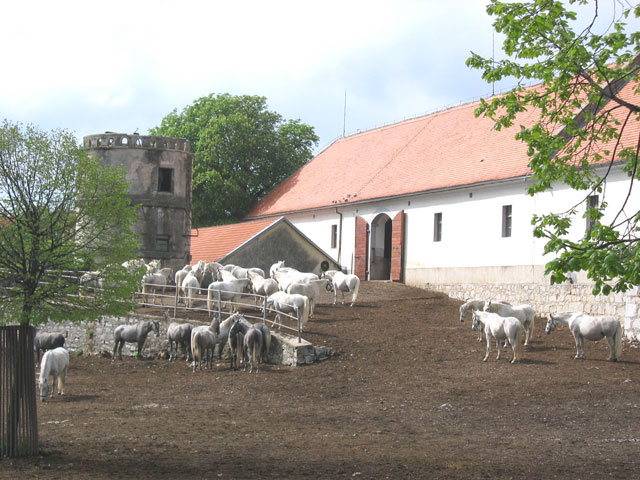
Lipica Stud Farm

Lipica is the origin of the Lipizzan horse. The Lipizzan breed as known today was fully developed in the time of Maria Theresa of Austria, whose husband was greatly interested in horse-breeding. During the Napoleonic wars, the stud farm was relocated to Székesfehérvár. In 1802, an earthquake struck Lipica, killing large numbers of horses. The stud farm was relocated to Đakovo in 1805, to Pecica (near Mezőhegyes) in 1809, to Laxenburg during the First World War, and then to Kladruby nad Labem.

After the First World War, when Lipica was awarded to Italy, most of the horses were returned to Lipica. On 16 October 1943, the stud farm and 178 horses were relocated to Hostouň. After the Second World War, the farm had only 11 horses; all of the others had been confiscated by the Germans during the war. In the 1960s, Lipica was opened to tourists and new development began. In 1996, Lipica became a public institution that is owned by the Republic of Slovenia and has made significant progress since then.

Queen Elizabeth II visited Lipica and its stud farm on 22 October 2008 and was presented with a Lipizzan horse as a gift from the Slovenian people. The queen's horse remains at the Lipica Stud Farm because it was requested that the farm care for it on her behalf. Today the Lipica Stud Farm is fully functional and breeds the finest horses for haute-école riding.

The stud farm now also includes a hotel and leisure complex with a golf course, as well as the Lipikum Museum dedicated to various aspects of the stud and the Lipizzan breed, including guided tours of the stud farm.

== The Lipica Open ==
The Lipica Open is an international orienteering competition that is held every year on the second weekend of March. It is the biggest orienteering competition in Slovenia and was held for the first time in 1992.

== Other places of interest ==
Other places of interest in and near Lipica include:

- The Avgust Černigoj gallery
- The Škocjan Caves system, a UNESCO World Heritage Site.
- Vilenica Cave, the oldest show cave in Europe (with guided tours since 1633)
- The Valley of Our Lady of Lourdes (Slovene: Dolina Lurške Matere Božje): an outdoor church and a local pilgrimage destination

=== Grand Casino Lipica ===
Grand Casino Lipica is located in Lipica. It is owned and operated by Casino Portorož d.d. The casino opened in 1989 and was completely renovated in 2023.

== Notable people ==
Notable people that were born or lived in Lipica include:

- Ivan Slavec (1859–1940), co-founder of the newspaper Primorski list and the last Slovene-speaking priest at the Trieste cathedral
