= Lazu (Mureș) =

Lazu Láz-patak
- Location within Romania

Location
- Country: Romania
- Counties: Hunedoara County
- Villages: Rapolțel, Rapoltu Mare

Physical characteristics
- Mouth: Mureș
  - location: Rapoltu Mare
  - coordinates: 45.8521°N 23.0815°E
- Length: 11 km (6.8 mi)
- Basin size: 19 km^{2} (7.3 sq mi)

Basin features
- Progression: Mureș→ Tisza→ Danube→ Black Sea

The Lazu (Hungarian: Láz-patak) is a right tributary of the river Mureș in Transylvania, Romania. It discharges into the Mureș in Rapoltu Mare. Its length is 11 km (6.8 mi) and its basin size is 19 km^{2} (7.3 sq mi). Its name originates from the Hungarian, means “Fever Creek”.
