= AZ =

AZ or az may refer to:

== People ==
- Az people, Turkophone people from present-day Russia
- Azie Faison (born 1964; known as AZ), former drug dealer from New York, US

=== People in arts and media ===
- AZ (rapper) (born 1972), rapper from Brooklyn, New York, US
- AZ Martinez (born 2003), Filipina actress, host and beauty queen

== Language ==
- Azerbaijani language (ISO 639-1 code: az)
- Az, the acrophonic name of the letter A (Cyrillic) in the old Russian alphabet

== Geography ==
- Azimuth, the horizontal component of a compass direction
- Arizona (postal abbreviation: AZ), a US state
- Azerbaijan (ISO 3166-1 country code: AZ), a Eurasian country

== Transportation ==
- Toyota AZ engine, an engine family
- Lighter-than-air aircraft tender (AZ), a US Navy hull classification symbol
- ITA Airways (IATA code: AZ), the national airline of Italy
- Alitalia (former IATA code: AZ), a former Italian airline

== Computing ==
- .az, the country code top level domain for the nation of Azerbaijan
- AlphaZero, game-playing artificial intelligence

== Arts and media ==
- § People in arts and media
- AZ (record label), a French record label
- Abendzeitung, a newspaper based in Munich, Germany
- Assignment Zero, a crowdsourced journalism project

== Sports ==
- Alkmaar Zaanstreek, formerly AZ '67, a Dutch Eredivisie football club
  - AZ (women), the affiliated women's football club (2007–2011)
- AZ Alkmaar, is a Dutch professional football club from Alkmaar

== Other uses ==
- AstraZeneca, a UK-based pharmaceutical company
  - Oxford–AstraZeneca COVID-19 vaccine (AZ), their COVID-19 vaccine
- Ministry of General Affairs (Ministerie van Algemene Zaken), a Dutch Government ministry

== See also ==
- A–Z (disambiguation)
- AZ1 (disambiguation)
- ZA (disambiguation)
