= Teophilus Seremi =

- Metropolitan Bălgrad of Transylvania
- Church: Romanian Greek Catholic Church
- Installed: 1692
- Term ended: July 1697
- Successor: Atanasie Anghel

Personal details
- Died: July 1697 Alba Iulia

Teophilus Seremi (also spelled Szeremi; died July 1697) was an Orthodox bishop and metropolitan of Bălgrad (of Transylvania) between 1692 and 1697. His name was Thomas Seremi layman and was part of the gentry Teiuş (nemes). He started the negotiations for union with the Catholic Church Metropolitan of Transylvania, laying the foundation of the Romanian Church United with Rome, Greek-Catholic.

After discussions with the Jesuit Ladislas Baranyi, Theophilus Seremi convened in 1697 metropolitan council. Through a conciliar document dated 21 March 1697 decided the union with Rome following the rules of the council of Florence and previous examples of the Union of Brest and training Mukacheve Greek Catholic diocese. Romanian clergy would receive the same privileges and immunities as the Latin-rite clergy. On 4 April 1697 the Imperial Chancellor Franz Ulrich Kinsky, presented in Vienna requested the union of the Metropolitan Bishop Theophilus of Bălgrad with the Catholic Church and an Imperial resolution favorable in this respect.

== Sources ==
- Biography on the website of the Romanian Church United with Rome
- History of Archieparchia of Alba Iulia and Făgăraş
- Romanian Church History by Nicolae Iorga.
- Gheorghe Șincai, Works, III, Chronicle of Romanians and more nations ed. Fugariu F., Bucharest, 1969
- - Biografie pe situl Bisericii Române Unite cu Roma.
