= Láz (Třebíč District) =

- Municipality
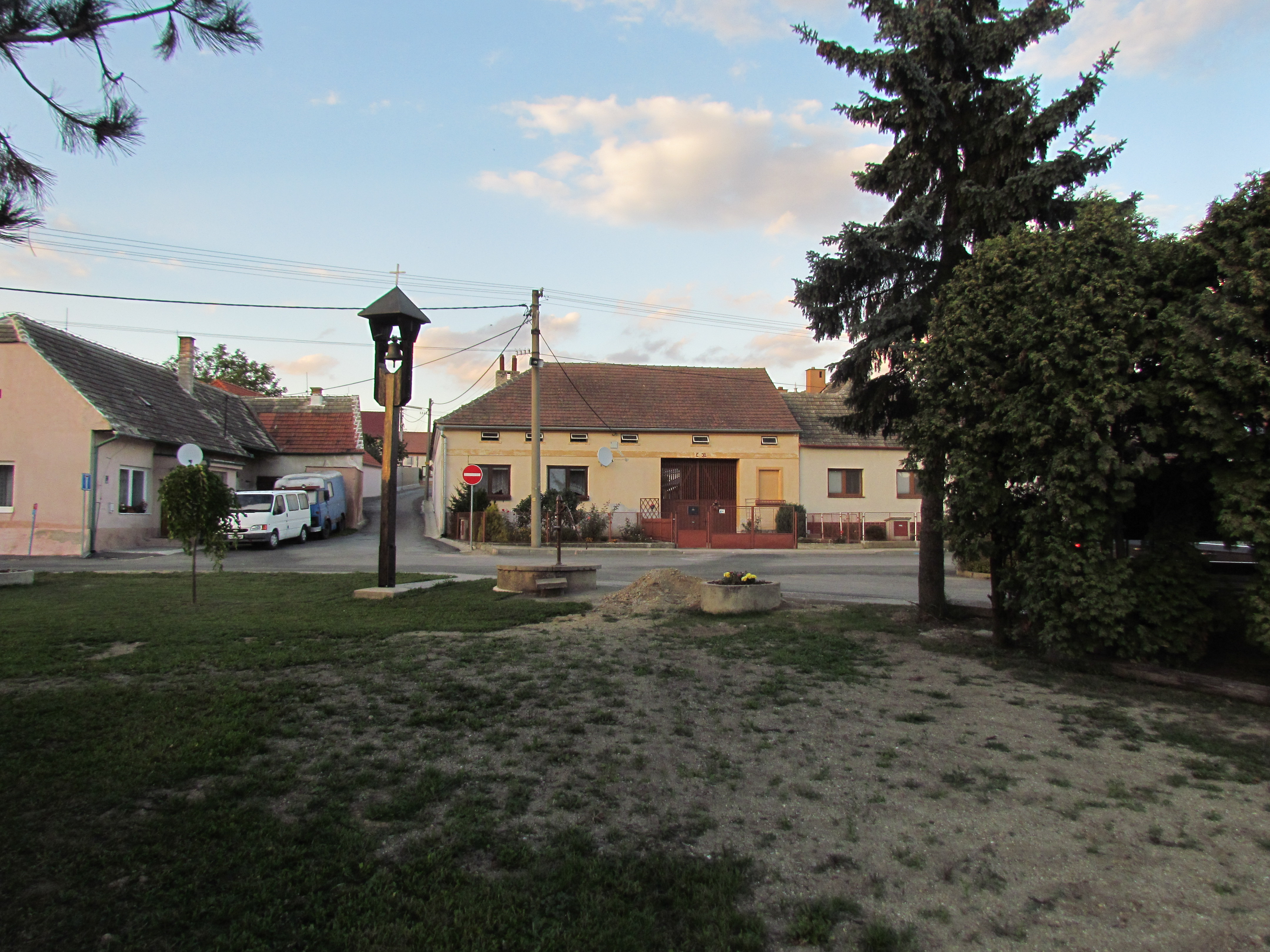
- Centre of Láz

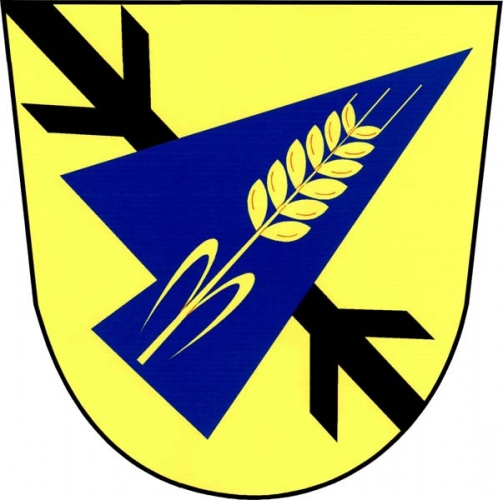
- Flag Coat of arms

- Location in the Czech Republic
- Coordinates: 49°0′44″N 15°47′6″E
- Country: Czech Republic
- Region: Vysočina
- District: Třebíč
- First mentioned: 1498

Area
  - Total: 4.68 km^{2} (1.81 sq mi)
- Elevation: 430 m (1,410 ft)

Population (2026-01-01)
  - Total: 289
  - Density: 61.8/km^{2} (160/sq mi)
- Time zone: UTC+1 (CET)
  - Summer (DST): UTC+2 (CEST)
- Postal code: 675 41
- Website: www.obec-laz.cz

Láz is a municipality and village in Třebíč District in the Vysočina Region of the Czech Republic. It has about 300 inhabitants.

== Etymology ==
The Czech word láz originally meant a field or meadow created by felling or burning a forest, or a field next to a forest.

== Geography ==
Láz is located about 23 kilometres (14 mi) south of Třebíč and 45 km (28 mi) south of Jihlava. It lies in an agricultural landscape in the Jevišovice Uplands. The fishpond Hájský rybník is situated in the eastern part of the municipality.

== History ==
The first written mention of Láz is from 1498, when it was property of King Vladislaus II. In 1510, the village was annexed to the Bítov estate. Later it became part of the Nové Syrovice estate.

== Demographics ==
Historical population

Year	Pop.	±%
1869	303	—
1880	302	−0.3%
1890	311	+3.0%
1900	314	+1.0%
1910	305	−2.9%

Year	Pop.	±%
1921	314	+3.0%
1930	323	+2.9%
1950	293	−9.3%
1961	319	+8.9%
1970	311	−2.5%

Year	Pop.	±%
1980	300	−3.5%
1991	283	−5.7%
2001	280	−1.1%
2011	282	+0.7%
2021	272	−3.5%

Source: Censuses

== Transport ==
There are no railways or major roads passing through the municipality.

== Sights ==
The most valuable landmark is a wooden belfry from the early 19th century.
