= A2Z =

A2Z may refer to:

- A2Z (2006 film), a 2006 German action film
- A2Z (TV network), a Philippine television network
  - A2Z News Alert, a Philippine television newscast broadcast by A2Z (TV network)
- History of Music Videos A to Z, a VH1 program
