= Lažany, Slovakia =

Lažany
- Municipality
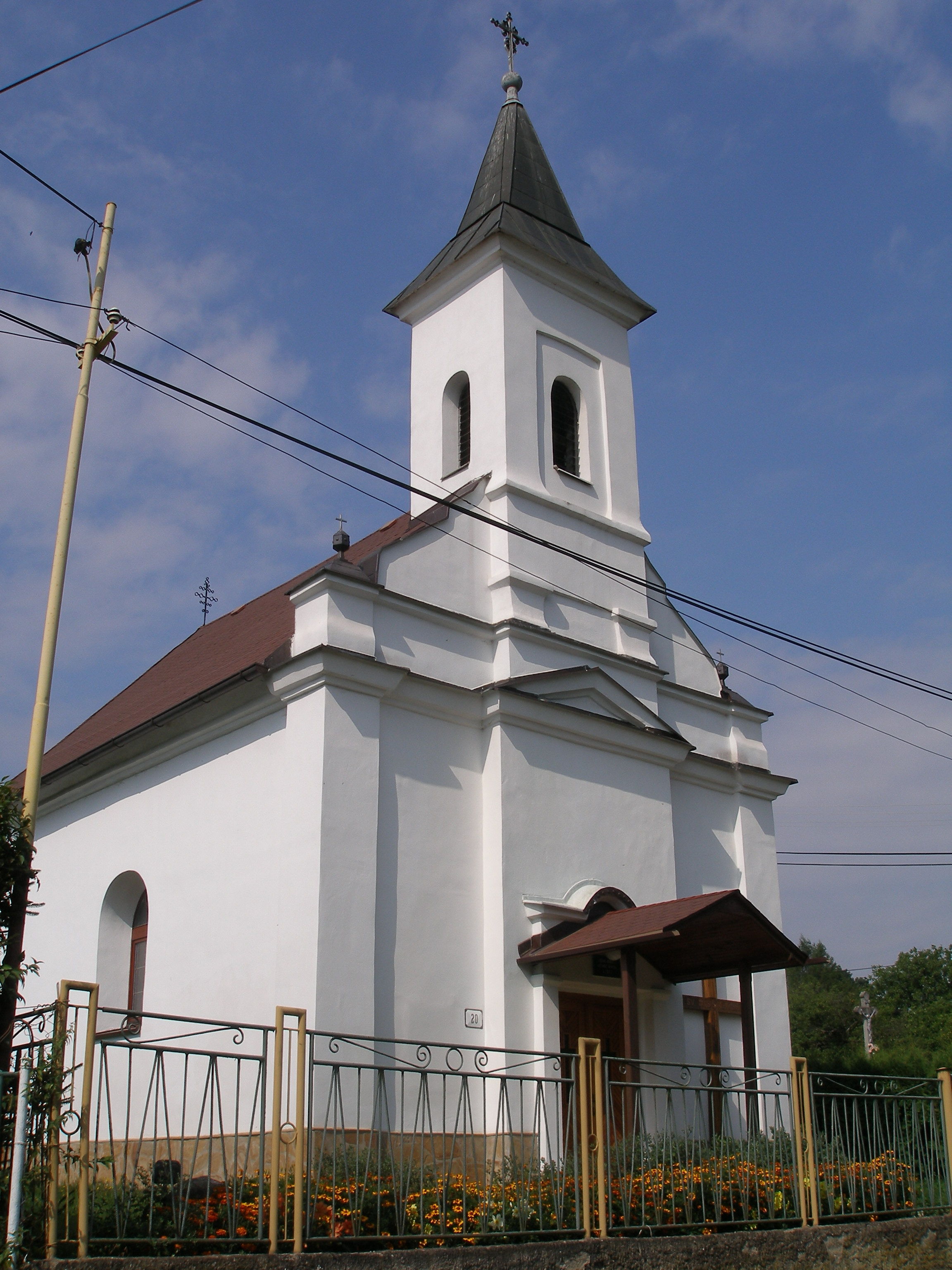

- Flag

- Location of Lažany in the Prešov Region Location of Lažany in Slovakia
- Coordinates: 49.03°N 21.10°E
- Country: Slovakia
- Region: Prešov Region
- District: Prešov District
- First mentioned: 1320

Area
  - Total: 1.31 km^{2} (0.51 sq mi)
- Elevation: 383 m (1,257 ft)

Population (2025)
  - Total: 161
- Time zone: UTC+1 (CET)
  - Summer (DST): UTC+2 (CEST)
- Postal code: 823 2
- Area code: +421 51
- Vehicle registration plate (until 2022): PO

Lažany (Hungarian: Lászka) is a small village and municipality in Prešov District in the Prešov Region of eastern Slovakia.

== Name ==
The name comes from Slovak Laz – a kind of small mountain village.

== History ==
In historical records the village was first mentioned in 1320.

== Geography ==
The municipality lies at an altitude of 383 metres (1,257 ft) and covers an area of 1.31 km^{2} (0.51 sq mi) (2025).

== Population ==
Population statistic (10 years)
Year	1995	2005	2015	2025
Count	129	156	179	161
Difference		+20.93%	+14.74%	−10.05%

Population statistic
Year	2024	2025
Count	161	161
Difference		+0%

It has a population of 161 people (31 December 2025).

=== Ethnicity ===
Census 2021 (1+ %)
Ethnicity	Number	Fraction
Slovak	172	97.72%
Not found out	5	2.84%
Total	176	

In year 2021 was 176 people by ethnicity 172 as Slovak, 5 as Not found out and 1 as Other.

Note on population: The difference values of population numbers in the table "Population statistic" and in the sections "Ethnicity" & "Religion" is caused by the use of various statistical methods.

=== Religion ===
Census 2021 (1+ %)
Religion	Number	Fraction
Roman Catholic Church	146	82.95%
None	23	13.07%
Not found out	4	2.27%
Evangelical Church	3	1.7%
Total	176	

In year 2021 was 176 people by religion 146 from Roman Catholic Church, 23 from None, 4 from Not found out and 3 from Evangelical Church.
