= Láz (Příbram District) =

- Municipality
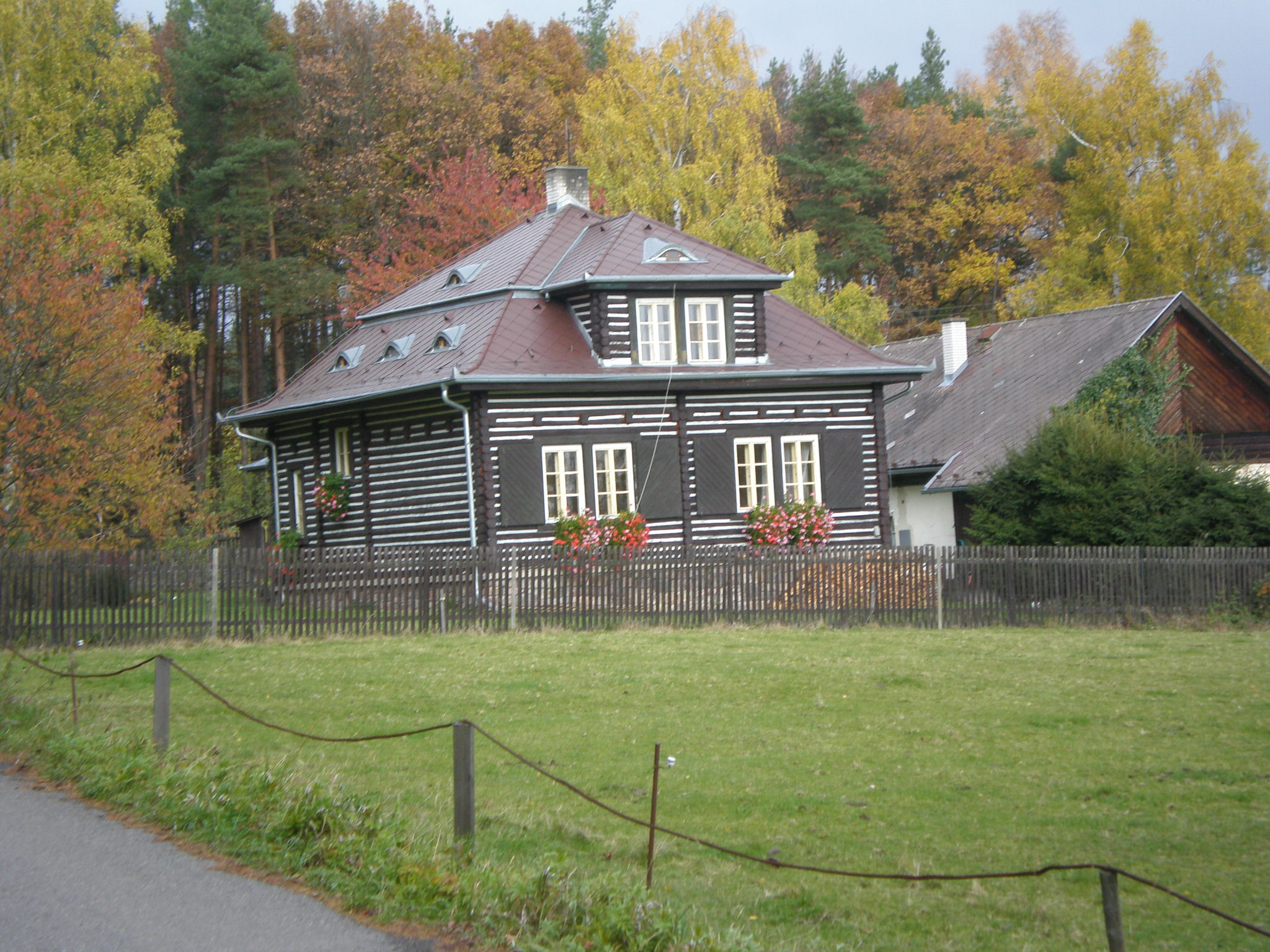
- Old hunting lodge

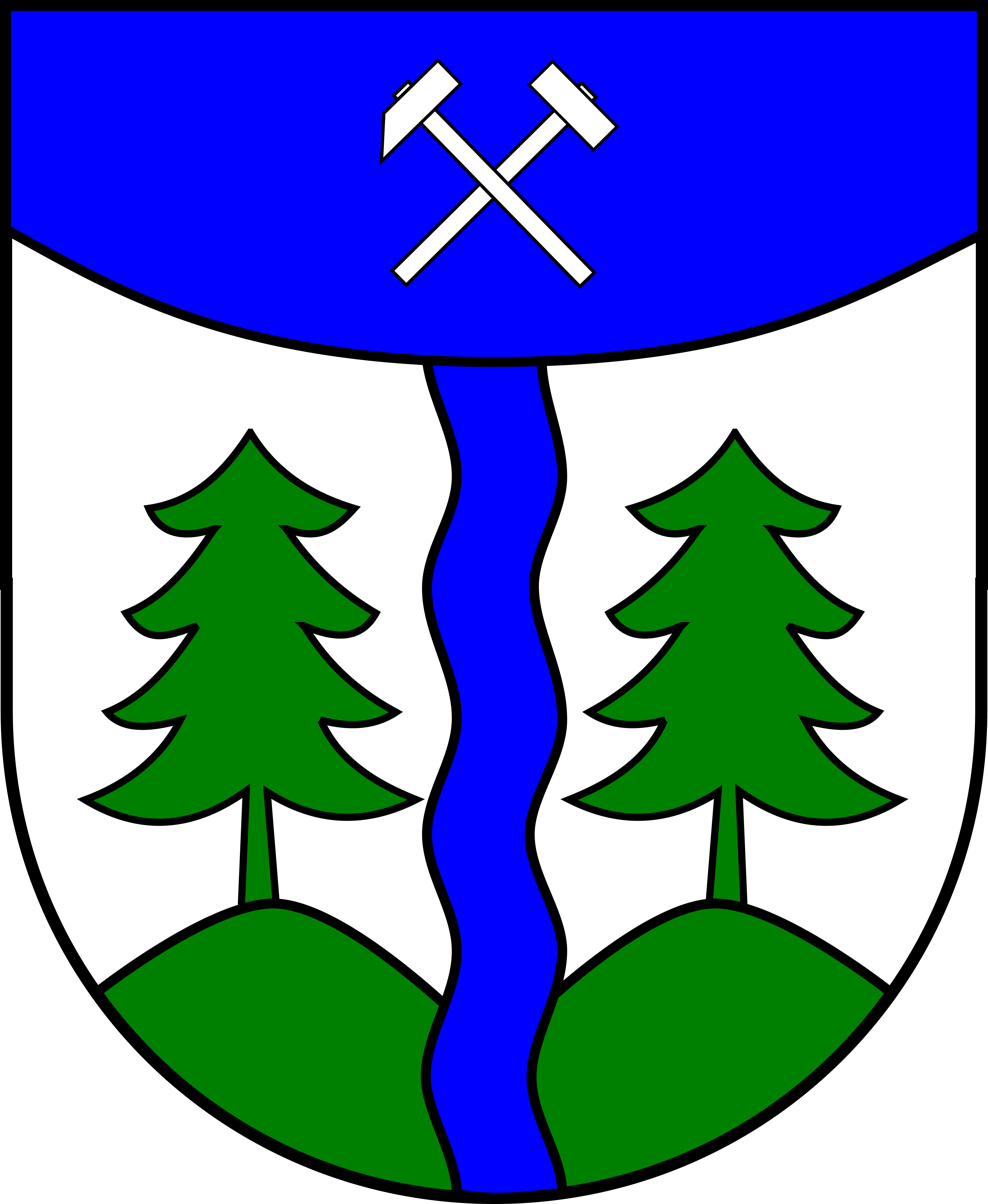
- Flag Coat of arms

- Location in the Czech Republic
- Coordinates: 49°39′8″N 13°55′0″E
- Country: Czech Republic
- Region: Central Bohemian
- District: Příbram
- First mentioned: 1349

Area
  - Total: 5.16 km^{2} (1.99 sq mi)
- Elevation: 588 m (1,929 ft)

Population (2026-01-01)
  - Total: 626
  - Density: 121/km^{2} (314/sq mi)
- Time zone: UTC+1 (CET)
  - Summer (DST): UTC+2 (CEST)
- Postal code: 262 41
- Website: www.obeclaz.eu

Láz is a municipality and village in Příbram District in the Central Bohemian Region of the Czech Republic. It has about 600 inhabitants.

== Demographics ==
Historical population
Year	Pop.	±%
1869	915	—
1880	1,125	+23.0%
1890	1,109	−1.4%
1900	1,105	−0.4%
1910	909	−17.7%
1921	817	−10.1%
1930	767	−6.1%
1950	566	−26.2%
1961	583	+3.0%
1970	490	−16.0%
1980	494	+0.8%
1991	483	−2.2%
2001	536	+11.0%
2011	573	+6.9%
2021	579	+1.0%
Source: Censuses
