= Lazu =

Lazu may refer to:

== Romania ==
- Lazu, a village in Agigea Commune, Constanța County
- Lazu, a village in Terpezița Commune, Dolj County
- Lazu, a village in Malovăț Commune, Mehedinți County
- Lazu, a village in Gherghești Commune, Vaslui County
- Lazu, a tributary of the Danube–Black Sea Canal in Constanța County
- Lazu (Mureș), a tributary of the Mureș in Hunedoara County
- Lazu, a tributary of the Mara in Maramureș County
- Lazu, a tributary of the Crișul Pietros in Bihor County

== India ==
- Lazu, Arunachal Pradesh, a village in Tirap district of Arunachal Pradesh in India

== See also ==
- Laz (disambiguation)
