= Assignment Zero =

Assignment Zero (AZ) was an experiment in crowd-sourced journalism, allowing collaboration between amateur and professional journalists to collectively produce a piece of work that describes correlations between crowd-sourced techniques and a popular movement.

== Theory ==
The goal of Assignment Zero was to create a publishable, edited story that is an amalgamation of input from various "real" sources. In Jeff Howe's "Guide to Crowdsourcing" on the AZ Site, the method of contribution is broken down into three categories:

- Tapping the Collective Brain
- The Crowd Creates
- The Crowd Filters

Collectively, these three categories attempt to illustrate a concept that: many people ("Crowds") by virtue of their size and diversity have the capability to contribute, create, and peer-review much of the content that is submitted to the project.

Wikipedia and Citizendium, both offering the capability for many people to contribute content for the masses, follow this basic model. The idea behind AZ is to implement this model with journalistic oversight, coupled with the ethics of journalism.

== Origin of "crowdsourcing" ==
So far, the earliest use of the term "crowdsourcing" can be attributed to Jeff Howe's blog post which was published on 24 May 2006. This predates the Wired article that Howe wrote on the subject which appeared in the June 2006 issue.

Although Howe may have coined the term, it is apparent by virtue of Howe's research that the concept predates the word's first printed use. In a blog post by Howe, he references an article written for Wired by Thomas Goetz that discusses peer production itself. Howe notes that "while the fact of peer production itself was becoming well-documented... no one we were aware of had documented the ways in which corporations were employing intelligent networks to put peer production to work."

== Staff ==
The following is a partial list of the individuals responsible for the execution of AZ:

- David Cohn – David Cohn is the associate editor for Assignment Zero. He is currently working toward a master's degree in journalism at Columbia University, and holds a degree in philosophy from University of California at Berkeley. David has also contributed articles to Seed Magazine.
- Steve Fox – Steve Fox is the regional coordinator for the Online News Association(ONA) in the Midatlantic Region, based in Washington, D.C. Up until late 2006, Steve was also the Politics Editor at Washingtonpost.com. He is also an adjunct instructor at the University of Maryland's School of Journalism.
- Tish Grier – Tish Grier was the Editorial Blogger at Corante Media Hub until October 2006. She has also contributed to The Huffington Post and writes at the blog the Constant Observer
- Evan Hansen – Evan Hansen was a writer for CNet's News.com, and a 2006 Finalist for UCLA Anderson School of Management's Gerald Loeb Award in the category of "News Services or Online Content." He is currently the editor-in-chief of Wired News and the consulting editor of AZ.
- Amanda Michael – Amanda Michael was the Communications Director for the Berkman Center for Internet & Society at Harvard Law School from March 2004 to November 2006.
- Jay Rosen – Jay Rosen is the Executive Editor of Assignment Zero. Rosen has been a member of the Journalism faculty at New York University(NYU) since 1986. He has taught courses in media criticism, cultural journalism, press ethics, and other subjects related to journalism.
- Lauren Sandler – Lauren Sandler was also a former producer and reporter at National Public Radio. In 2000, Lauren graduated from New York University's Cultural Reporting and Criticism program to launch a freelance career in journalism.

== Produced work ==
On 1 May 2007, a final draft of a piece on Citizendium was completed and submitted to Wired for on-line publication. The article ran on 3 May 2007, but it has not been subject to peer review. The article has generated some controversy, however, due to users editing the article after it was published.

The modification occurred on 6 May 2007, after an interview with Wales that was published on the Assignment Zero site on 4 May 2007 (two days previously). Michael Ho, the main writer of the original piece, noticed the adjustment on 8 May 2007, which spurred comment from both Jay Rosen, editor of Wired.com, and prompted a response attributed to Larry Sanger.

Additional selections from the contributors at AZ were published on wired.com on 9 July 2007. and ran through 13 July 2007 On 17 July 2007, a post-mortem was written by Jeff Howe about the conclusion of Assignment Zero. In the end, Howe considered Assignment Zero a "highly satisfying failure".

== Locality ==
Most topics, as of 26 April 2007, focus on concepts, events happening and subjects living within the United States. An international topic page does exist, and currently focuses on crowdsourcing ventures in Brazil, Europe, and Canada. International subjects are not discouraged, but currently there is not a focus on them.

== Contributors versus users ==
The AZ site maintains two lists of users. One list displays the profiles of all AZ Site Members and a masthead that shows a listing of actual AZ staff; the second list catalogs click-able profiles for Contributors.

== Copyright ==
AZ is currently operating under a Creative Commons Attribution-Share Alike 3.0 License.

== Support ==
AZ was a collaborative experiment between Wired Magazine, NewAssignment.net and other participants.
