= Sony Action Cam =

The Sony Action Cam is a series of video-recording devices made by Sony, intended for capturing video while practicing sports.

The lineup currently comprises:

- HDR-AS10: a 170º FOV camera featuring 1080p 30 FPS video, 720p slow motion up to 120 FPS or 1080p at 60 FPS via a firmware update. It features a Carl Zeiss Vario-Tessar lens and Exmor R CMOS sensor and BIONZ image processor with SteadyShot image stabilization. It offers a micro HDMI port and micro SD card slot.
- HDR-AS15: Compared to the AS10, the AS15 adds Wi-Fi connectivity.
- HDR-AS20
- HDR-AS30V
- HDR-AS50: Capable of full HD at 60 FPS, 120 FPS slow motion, and 4K time lapse
- HDR-AS100V
- HDR-AS200V: Capable of full HD at 60 FPS
- HDR-AS300
- HDR-AZ1
- FDR-X1000V: Capable of 4K at 30 FPS
- FDR-X3000: Capable of 4K at 30 FPS, 100 Mbps recording. Features Sony's own Balanced Optical SteadyShot also featured in the AS300.
