= MARK4 =

Protein-coding gene in the species Homo sapiens

Identifiers
- Aliases: MARK4, MARK4L, MARK4S, MARKL1, MARKL1L, PAR-1D, microtubule affinity regulating kinase 4
- External IDs: OMIM: 606495; MGI: 1920955; GeneCards: MARK4
Available structures
PDB	Ortholog search: PDBe RCSB
PDB	List of PDB id codes 5ES1
Enzyme activity
EC #	BRENDA	ExPASy	KEGG	MetaCyc
2.7.11.1	↗	↗	↗	↗

Gene location (Human)
Chr.	Chromosome 19 (human)
Band	19q13.32	Start	45,079,288 bp
Band	19q13.32	End	45,305,284 bp

Gene location (Mouse)
Chr.	Chromosome 7 (mouse)
Band	7|7 A3	Start	19,158,700 bp
Band	7|7 A3	End	19,192,746 bp
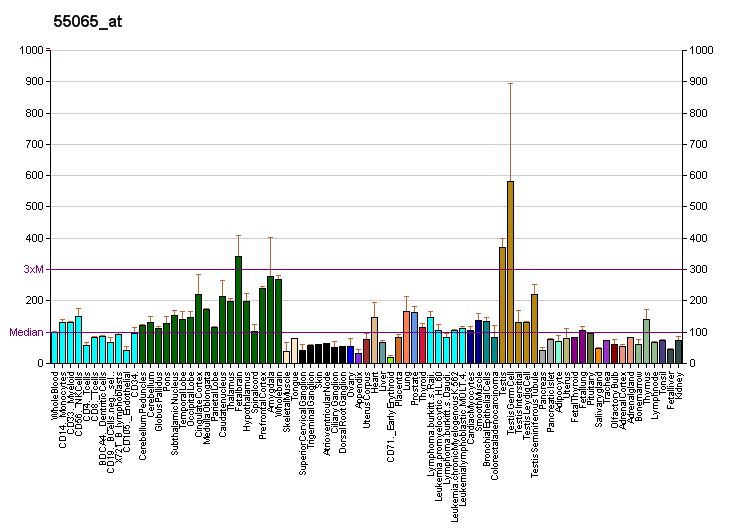

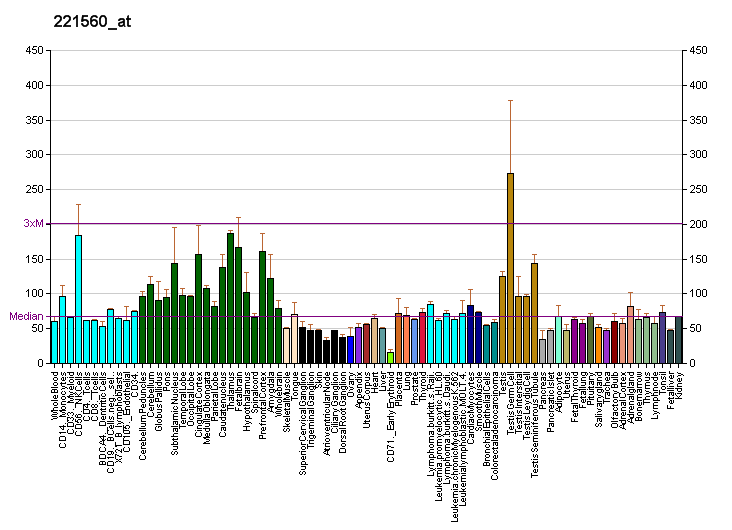
RNA expression pattern
Bgee	Human / Mouse (ortholog); Top expressed in: lateral nuclear group of thalamus; ganglionic eminence; prefrontal cortex; parotid gland; Region I of hippocampus proper; stromal cell of endometrium; right testis; left testis; endothelial cell; putamen / Top expressed in: internal carotid artery; external carotid artery; granulocyte; lip; motor neuron; neural layer of retina; superior frontal gyrus; dentate gyrus of hippocampal formation granule cell; primary visual cortex; habenula; More reference expression data
BioGPS	More reference expression data
Gene ontology
Molecular function	transferase activity; nucleotide binding; protein kinase activity; microtubule binding; kinase activity; protein serine/threonine kinase activity; tau-protein kinase activity; ubiquitin binding; protein binding; gamma-tubulin binding; ATP binding; tau protein binding
Cellular component	ciliary basal body; cytosol; centrosome; microtubule cytoskeleton; neuron projection; cytoskeleton; cell projection; cytoplasm; microtubule organizing center; gamma-tubulin complex; dendrite; midbody
Biological process	phosphorylation; positive regulation of programmed cell death; nervous system development; protein phosphorylation; microtubule bundle formation; cell cycle; cell division; establishment of cell polarity; microtubule cytoskeleton organization; cell projection organization; ciliary basal body-plasma membrane docking; intracellular signal transduction; cilium organization; positive regulation of cilium assembly; regulation of centrosome cycle; positive regulation of protein localization to centrosome
Sources:Amigo / QuickGO
Orthologs
Databases	NCBI: entry; OMA: entry
Species	Human	Mouse
Entrez	57787	232944
Ensembl	ENSG00000007047	ENSMUSG00000030397
UniProt	Q96L34	Q8CIP4
RefSeq (mRNA)	NM_001199867; NM_031417	NM_172279; NM_001368427
RefSeq (protein)	NP_001186796; NP_113605	NP_758483; NP_001355356
Location (UCSC)	Chr 19: 45.08 – 45.31 Mb	Chr 7: 19.16 – 19.19 Mb
PubMed search
- Wikidata
View/Edit Human	View/Edit Mouse

MAP/microtubule affinity-regulating kinase 4 is an enzyme that in humans is encoded by the MARK4 gene. MARK4 belongs to the family of serine/threonine kinases that phosphorylate microtubule-associated proteins (MAP) causing their detachment from microtubules. Detachment thereby increases microtubule dynamics and facilitates a number of cell activities including cell division, cell cycle control, cell polarity determination, and cell shape alterations.

There are four members of the MARK protein family, MARK1-4, which are highly conserved. MARK4 kinase has been shown to be involved in microtubule organization in neuronal cells. Levels of MARK4 are elevated in Alzheimer's disease and may contribute to the pathological phosphorylation of tau protein in this disease.

== Interactions ==
MARK4 has been shown to interact with USP9X and Ubiquitin C.
