= Lažany (Liberec District) =

- Municipality
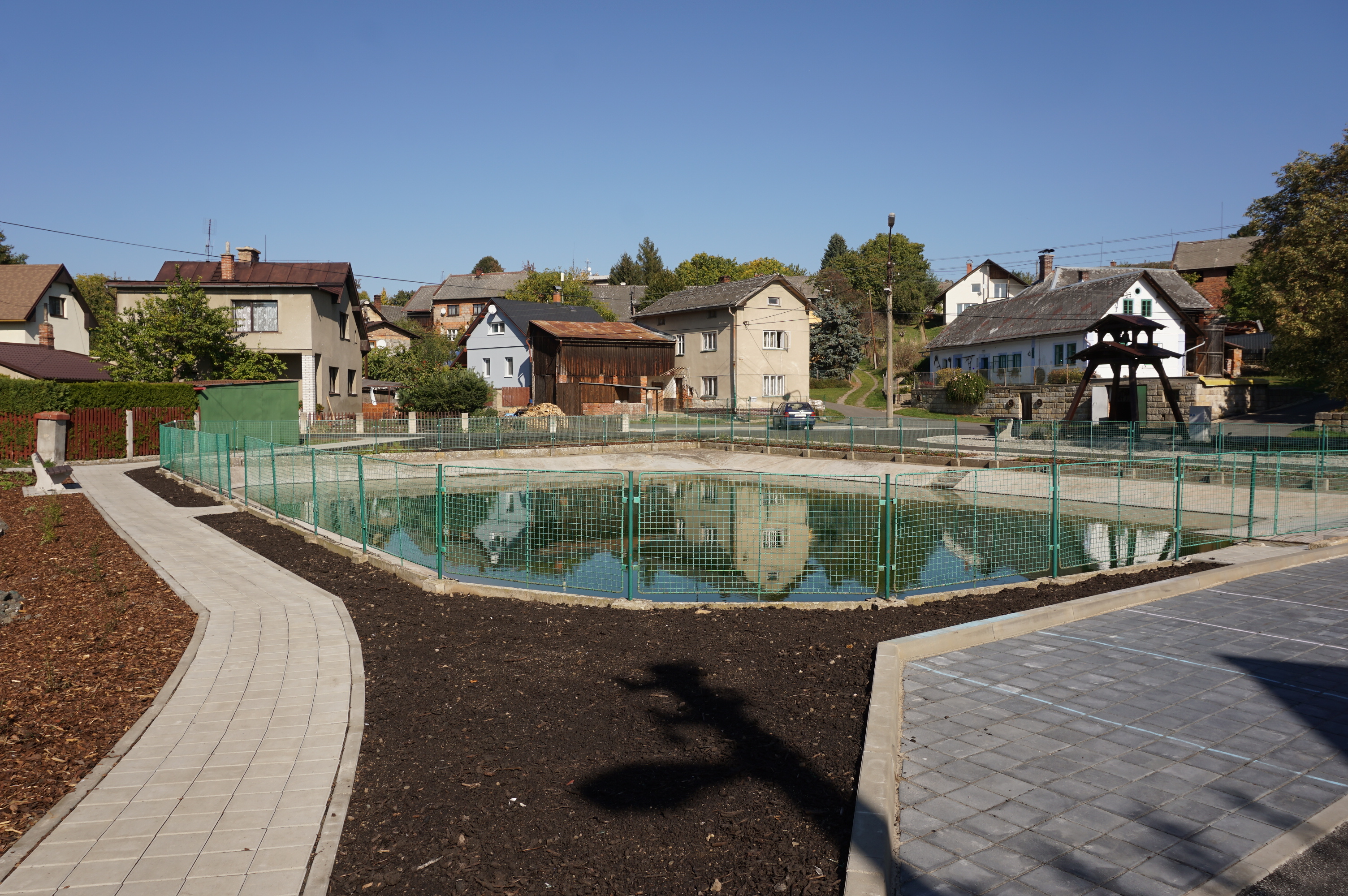
- Centre of Lažany

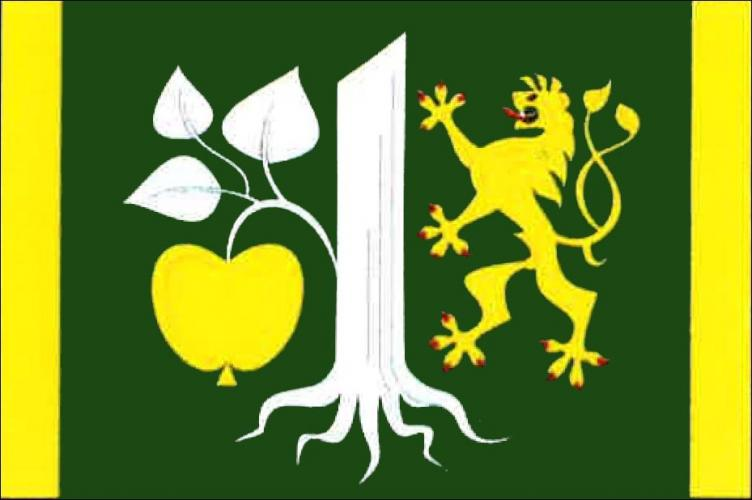
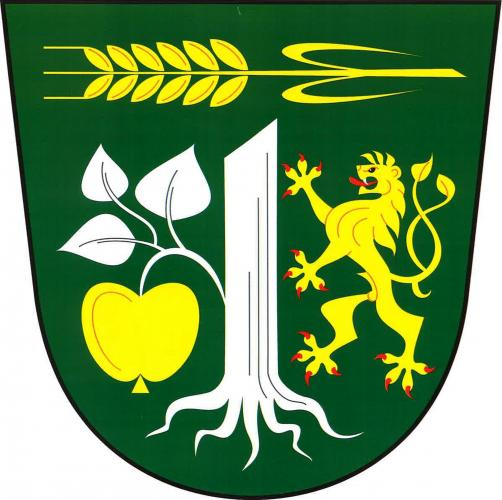
- Flag Coat of arms

- Location in the Czech Republic
- Coordinates: 50°36′3″N 15°6′35″E
- Country: Czech Republic
- Region: Liberec
- District: Liberec
- First mentioned: 1397

Area
  - Total: 2.09 km^{2} (0.81 sq mi)
- Elevation: 286 m (938 ft)

Population (2026-01-01)
  - Total: 234
  - Density: 112/km^{2} (290/sq mi)
- Time zone: UTC+1 (CET)
  - Summer (DST): UTC+2 (CEST)
- Postal code: 463 45
- Website: www.obec-lazany.cz

Lažany (German: Laschan) is a municipality and village in Liberec District in the Liberec Region of the Czech Republic. It has about 200 inhabitants.

== Etymology ==
The name means "the village of Lažans", which can be translated either as "the village of people who settled on láz (an Old Czech word meaning 'field' or 'land')" or "the village of people who came from a place called Láz".

== Geography ==
Lažany is located about 17 kilometres (11 mi) south of Liberec. It lies in the Jičín Uplands. The highest point is at 331 m (1,086 ft) above sea level.

== History ==
The first written mention of Lažany is from 1397.

== Demographics ==
Historical population

Year	Pop.	±%
1869	304	—
1880	317	+4.3%
1890	320	+0.9%
1900	306	−4.4%
1910	291	−4.9%

Year	Pop.	±%
1921	319	+9.6%
1930	308	−3.4%
1950	213	−30.8%
1961	206	−3.3%
1970	208	+1.0%

Year	Pop.	±%
1980	178	−14.4%
1991	192	+7.9%
2001	199	+3.6%
2011	220	+10.6%
2021	212	−3.6%

Source: Censuses

== Economy ==
Lažany is an agricultural municipality. It is known for its cider mill and the production of fruit drinks.

== Transport ==
The D10 motorway runs along the southern municipal border of Lažany and then continues as the I/35 road along the eastern municipal border.

== Sights ==
The only protected cultural monument in the municipality is a sandstone crucifix from 1821.
