= BCLAF1 =

Protein-coding gene in the species Homo sapiens

Identifiers
- Aliases: BCLAF1, BTF, bK211L9.1, BCL2 associated transcription factor 1
- External IDs: OMIM: 612588; MGI: 1917580; HomoloGene: 8832; GeneCards: BCLAF1; OMA:BCLAF1 - orthologs

Gene location (Human)
Chr.	Chromosome 6 (human)
Band	6q23.3	Start	136,256,627 bp
Band	6q23.3	End	136,289,851 bp

Gene location (Mouse)
Chr.	Chromosome 10 (mouse)
Band	10|10 A3	Start	20,312,469 bp
Band	10|10 A3	End	20,344,613 bp
RNA expression pattern
Bgee	Human / Mouse (ortholog); Top expressed in: Achilles tendon; tibia; embryo; caput epididymis; ventricular zone; skin of thigh; parietal pleura; corpus epididymis; epithelium of nasopharynx; skin of hip / Top expressed in: genital tubercle; tail of embryo; ventricular zone; abdominal wall; pineal gland; aortic valve; Gonadal ridge; Rostral migratory stream; neural layer of retina; maxillary prominence; More reference expression data
BioGPS	n/a
Gene ontology
Molecular function	DNA binding; protein binding; RNA binding
Cellular component	cytoplasm; nuclear speck; nucleus; nucleoplasm
Biological process	positive regulation of apoptotic process; regulation of DNA-templated transcription in response to stress; negative regulation of transcription, DNA-templated; regulation of transcription, DNA-templated; positive regulation of intrinsic apoptotic signaling pathway; positive regulation of DNA-templated transcription, initiation; positive regulation of response to DNA damage stimulus; transcription, DNA-templated; apoptotic process; cellular response to leukemia inhibitory factor
Sources:Amigo / QuickGO
Orthologs
Species	Human	Mouse
Entrez	9774	72567
Ensembl	ENSG00000029363	ENSMUSG00000037608
UniProt	Q9NYF8	Q8K019
RefSeq (mRNA)	NM_001077440; NM_001077441; NM_001301038; NM_014739; NM_001363659	NM_001025392; NM_001025393; NM_001025394; NM_153787
RefSeq (protein)	NP_001070908; NP_001070909; NP_001287967; NP_055554; NP_001350588	NP_001020563; NP_001020564; NP_722482
Location (UCSC)	Chr 6: 136.26 – 136.29 Mb	Chr 10: 20.31 – 20.34 Mb
PubMed search
- Wikidata
View/Edit Human	View/Edit Mouse

Bcl-2-associated transcription factor 1 is a Bcl-2 family protein in humans that is encoded by the BCLAF1 gene.

This gene encodes a transcriptional repressor that interacts with several members of the BCL-2 family of proteins. Overexpression of this protein induces apoptosis, which can be suppressed by co-expression of BCL2 proteins. The protein localizes to dot-like structures throughout the nucleus and redistributes to a zone near the nuclear envelope in cells undergoing apoptosis. Multiple transcript variants encoding different protein isoforms have been found for this gene.
