= AIZ =

AIZ may refer to:

- Anti-Imperialist Cell (Antiimperialistische Zelle ), a leftist militant group which carried out bombings in Germany in 1995
- Arbeiter-Illustrierte-Zeitung, a German illustrated magazine of the 1920s–30s
- Lee C. Fine Memorial Airport, Missouri, US (IATA code AIZ)
- Assurant, a specialized insurance company based in New York, NY
