= OneAZ Credit Union =

Arizona based credit union

- Company type: Credit union
- Industry: Financial services
- Founded: 1951
- Headquarters: Phoenix, Arizona; United States
- Area served: Anyone who lives in the state of Arizona; faculty, staff, students and alumni of Arizona's public universities and two community colleges; state employees and some private employees
- Key people: Martha Rozen, Chairperson
- Products: Savings; Checking; Consumer loans; Mortgages; Credit cards; Investments
- Total assets: $2.06B USD
- Website: oneazcu.com

OneAZ Credit Union is a federally insured natural person credit union headquartered in Phoenix, Arizona, chartered in the state of Arizona. OneAZ is the second-largest credit union by assets in the state. As of October 2018, there are 23 branch locations in the state of Arizona.

== History ==
The Arizona State Employees' Credit Union was founded on October 31, 1951, as a credit union for state employees. The field of membership expanded over time to include most of the state, as well as faculty, students, staff and alumni of Arizona's three major public universities, along with employees of other companies. In the early 1980s, the name expanded to Arizona State Employees' Savings and Credit Union; the "Employees" was dropped from the name later in the decade, while in 2006, the name was shortened again to Arizona State Credit Union.

In 2016, the credit union rebranded as OneAZ Credit Union. The name change was made to mitigate confusion with Arizona Federal Credit Union and other similarly named financial institutions, and because some still took the name to mean that only state employees could join. Additionally, in the wake of the name change, the credit union applied to expand its field of membership to include the last four counties in Arizona it did not already serve.
