= Rapoltu Mare =

Rapoltu Mar
- Commune
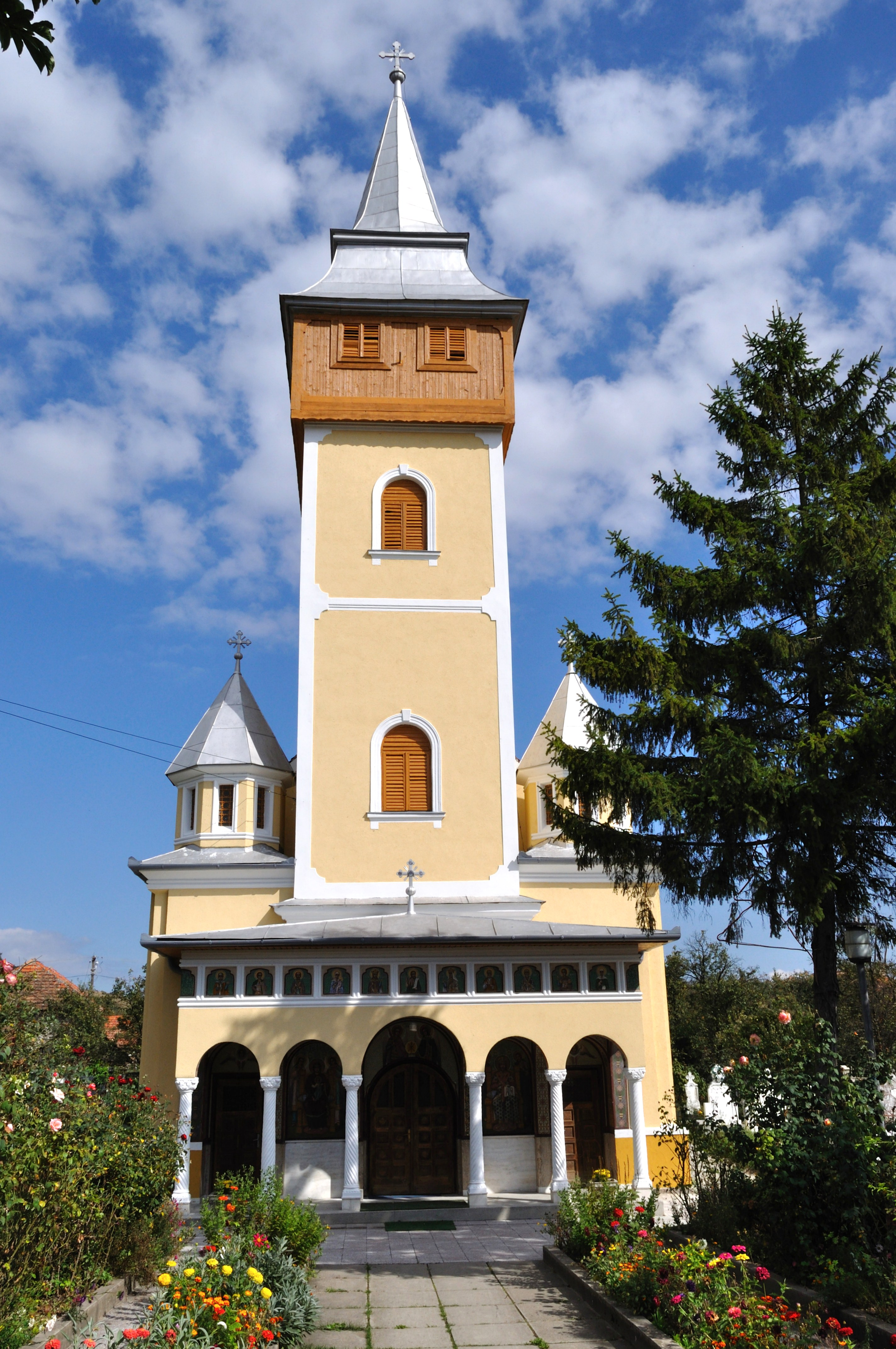
- Romanian Orthodox church in Bobâlna

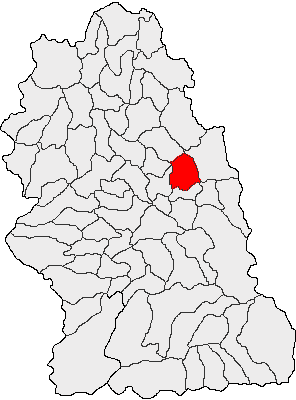
- Location in Hunedoara County

- Location in Romania
- Coordinates: 45°52′N 23°4′E
- Country: Romania
- County: Hunedoara

Government
  - Mayor (2024–2028): Octavian-Gheorghe Roman (PSD)
- Area: 80.99 km^{2} (31.27 sq mi)
- Elevation: 227 m (745 ft)
- Population (2021-12-01): 1,788
  - Density: 22.08/km^{2} (57.18/sq mi)
- Time zone: UTC+02:00 (EET)
  - Summer (DST): UTC+03:00 (EEST)
- Postal code: 337365
- Area code: (+40) 0254
- Vehicle reg.: HD
- Website: www.rapolt.ro

Rapoltu Mare (Hungarian: Nagyrápolt, German: Groß-Rapolden) is a commune in Hunedoara County, Transylvania, Romania. It is composed of five villages: Bobâlna (Bábolna), Boiu (Boj), Folt (Folt), Rapoltu Mare, and Rapolțel (Kisrápolt).

The Hungarian noble family Szent-Györgyi de Nagyrápolt has used the name of this village since the Middle Ages. Its most famous member is the scientist Albert Szent-Györgyi.

Historical population
Year	Pop.	±%
1850	3,305	—
1880	3,540	+7.1%
2002	2,066	−41.6%
2011	1,960	−5.1%
2021	1,788	−8.8%
Source: Census data

== Natives ==
- Atanasie Anghel (died 1713), Romanian Greek-Catholic bishop of Alba Iulia between 1698 and 1713
- József Somkuthy (1883–1961), Hungarian military officer and politician
