= Přestavlky (Plzeň-South District) =

- Municipality
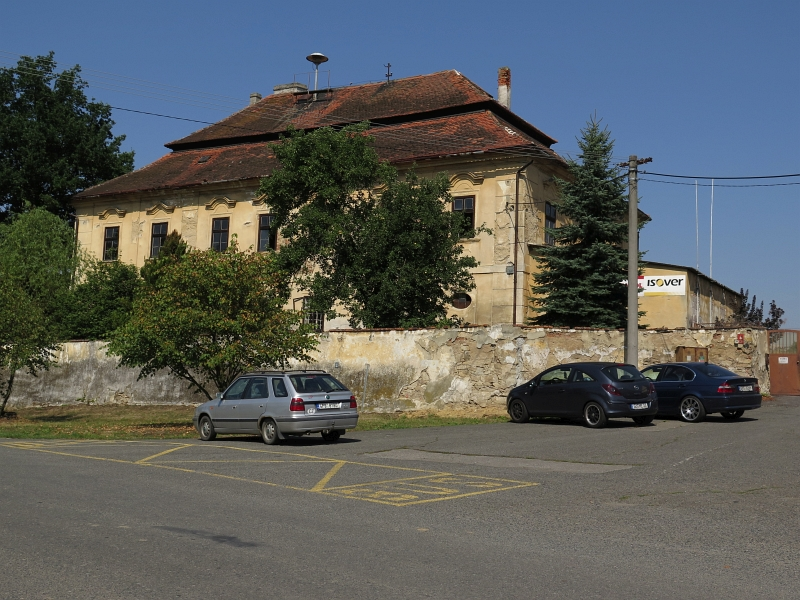
- Přestavlky Castle

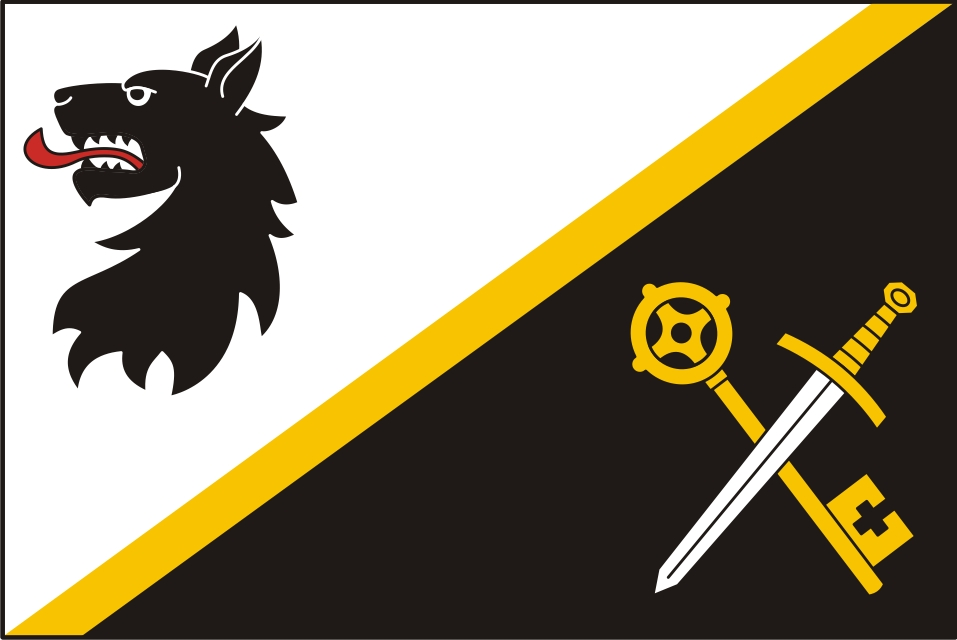
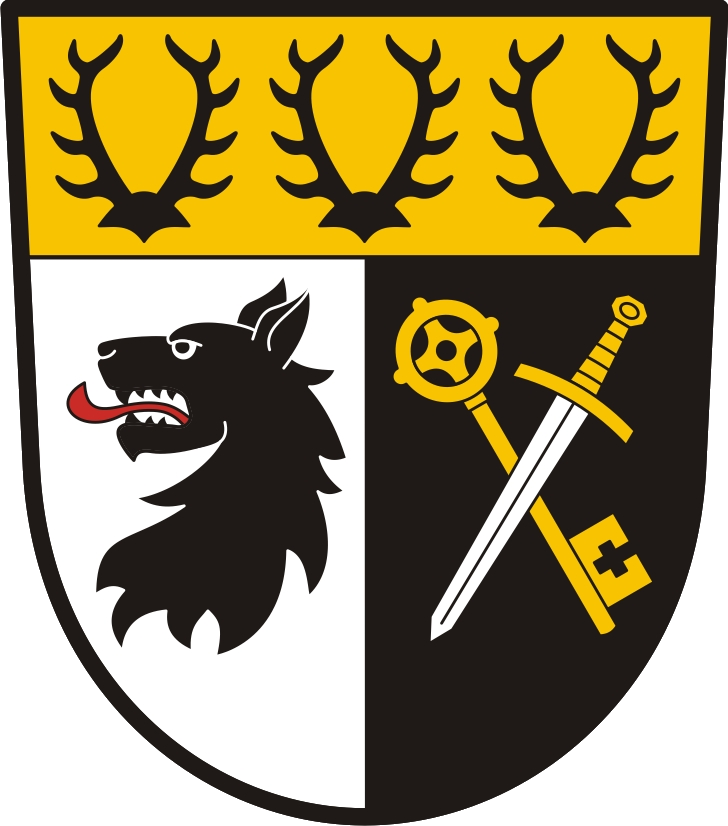
- Flag Coat of arms

- Location in the Czech Republic
- Coordinates: 49°35′59″N 13°14′40″E
- Country: Czech Republic
- Region: Plzeň
- District: Plzeň-South
- First mentioned: 1243

Area
  - Total: 9.83 km^{2} (3.80 sq mi)
- Elevation: 350 m (1,150 ft)

Population (2026-01-01)
  - Total: 234
  - Density: 23.8/km^{2} (61.7/sq mi)
- Time zone: UTC+1 (CET)
  - Summer (DST): UTC+2 (CEST)
- Postal code: 334 01
- Website: www.obecprestavlky.cz

Přestavlky is a municipality and village in Plzeň-South District in the Plzeň Region of the Czech Republic. It has about 200 inhabitants.

Přestavlky lies approximately 20 kilometres (12 mi) south-west of Plzeň and 101 km (63 mi) south-west of Prague.

== Administrative division ==
Přestavlky consists of two municipal parts (in brackets population according to the 2021 census):

- Přestavlky (208)
- Lažany (23)

== Demographics ==
Historical population
Year	Pop.	±%
1869	366	—
1880	385	+5.2%
1890	446	+15.8%
1900	447	+0.2%
1910	465	+4.0%
1921	469	+0.9%
1930	442	−5.8%
1950	381	−13.8%
1961	378	−0.8%
1970	327	−13.5%
1980	243	−25.7%
1991	207	−14.8%
2001	203	−1.9%
2011	222	+9.4%
2021	231	+4.1%
Source: Censuses
