= Dolní Lažany =

- Municipality
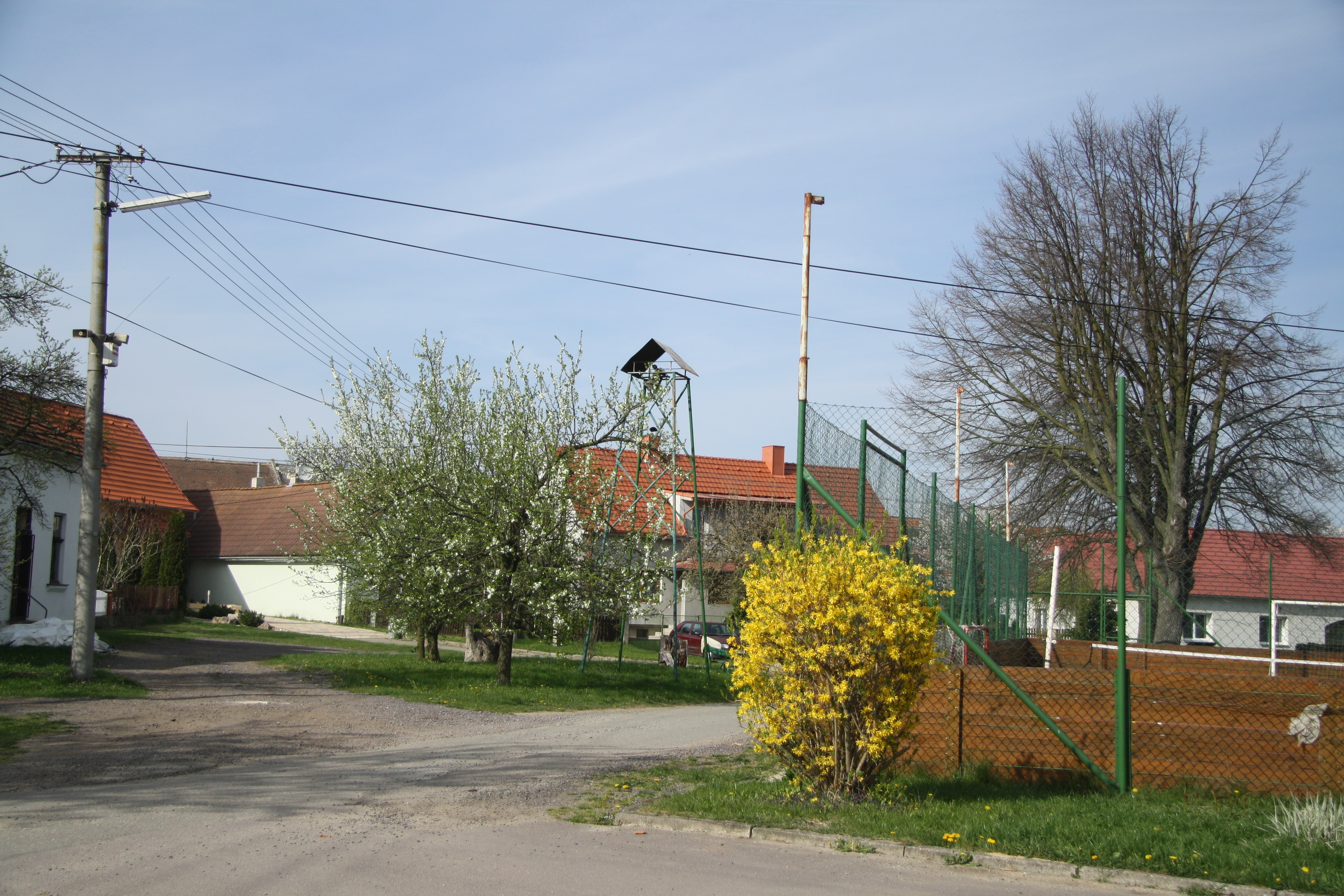
- Centre of Dolní Lažany

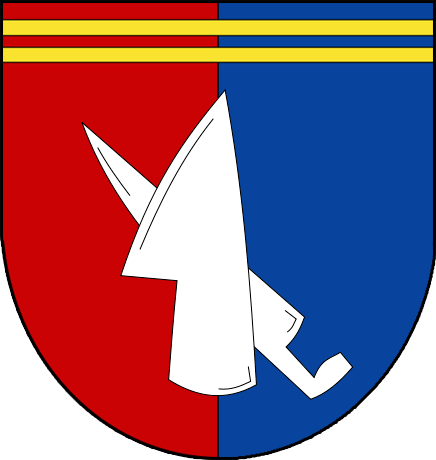
- Flag Coat of arms

- Location in the Czech Republic
- Coordinates: 49°6′0″N 15°49′22″E
- Country: Czech Republic
- Region: Vysočina
- District: Třebíč
- First mentioned: 1459

Area
  - Total: 5.45 km^{2} (2.10 sq mi)
- Elevation: 472 m (1,549 ft)

Population (2026-01-01)
  - Total: 156
  - Density: 28.6/km^{2} (74.1/sq mi)
- Time zone: UTC+1 (CET)
  - Summer (DST): UTC+2 (CEST)
- Postal code: 675 51
- Website: dolnilazany.cz

Dolní Lažany is a municipality and village in Třebíč District in the Vysočina Region of the Czech Republic. It has about 200 inhabitants.

Dolní Lažany lies approximately 13 kilometres (8 mi) south of Třebíč, 36 km (22 mi) south-east of Jihlava, and 148 km (92 mi) south-east of Prague.

== Demographics ==
Historical population
Year	Pop.	±%
1869	247	—
1880	283	+14.6%
1890	268	−5.3%
1900	253	−5.6%
1910	258	+2.0%
1921	274	+6.2%
1930	245	−10.6%
1950	189	−22.9%
1961	176	−6.9%
1970	148	−15.9%
1980	149	+0.7%
1991	147	−1.3%
2001	152	+3.4%
2011	147	−3.3%
2021	145	−1.4%
Source: Censuses
