= Centrosomal protein 131 =

Protein-coding gene in the species Homo sapiens

CEP131

Identifiers
- Aliases: CEP131, AZ1, AZI1, ZA1, centrosomal protein 131
- External IDs: OMIM: 613479; MGI: 107440; GeneCards: CEP131

Gene location (Human)
Chr.	Chromosome 17 (human)
Band	17q25.3	Start	81,189,593 bp
Band	17q25.3	End	81,222,999 bp

Gene location (Mouse)
Chr.	Chromosome 11 (mouse)
Band	11|11 E2	Start	120,064,430 bp
Band	11|11 E2	End	120,086,827 bp
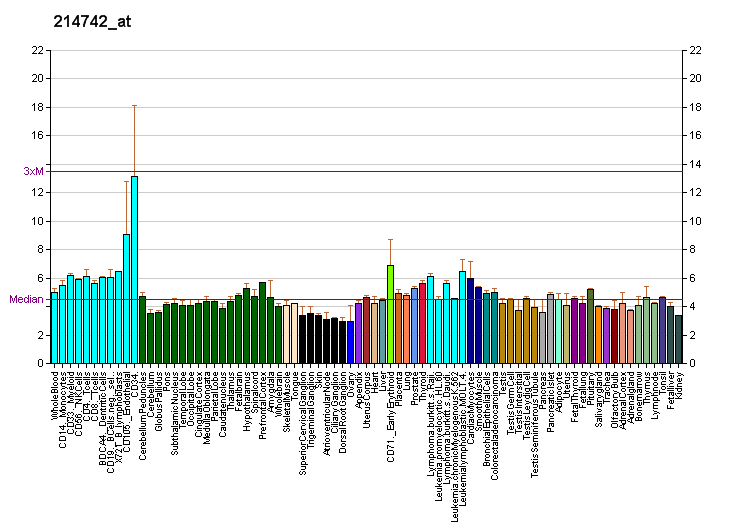
RNA expression pattern
Bgee	Human / Mouse (ortholog); Top expressed in: sural nerve; gonad; tendon of biceps brachii; apex of heart; right testis; left testis; ventricular zone; ganglionic eminence; right hemisphere of cerebellum; anterior pituitary / Top expressed in: ventricular zone; Rostral migratory stream; seminiferous tubule; motor neuron; granulocyte; neural layer of retina; tail of embryo; medullary collecting duct; ganglionic eminence; epiblast; More reference expression data
BioGPS	More reference expression data
Gene ontology
Molecular function	protein homodimerization activity; protein binding; protein-containing complex binding
Cellular component	cytoplasm; cytosol; centrosome; cell projection; intracellular membrane-bounded organelle; microtubule cytoskeleton; centriolar satellite; microtubule organizing center; acrosomal vesicle; intercellular bridge; cytoskeleton; cytoplasmic vesicle; ciliary transition zone; ciliary basal body; cilium
Biological process	positive regulation of intracellular protein transport; cell differentiation; regulation of centrosome duplication; multicellular organism development; intraciliary transport involved in cilium assembly; cell projection organization; G2/M transition of mitotic cell cycle; spermatogenesis; positive regulation of cell population proliferation; protein localization to centrosome; cell cycle; ciliary basal body-plasma membrane docking; regulation of G2/M transition of mitotic cell cycle; cilium assembly
Sources:Amigo / QuickGO
Orthologs
Databases	NCBI: entry; OMA: entry
Species	Human	Mouse
Entrez	22994	12009
Ensembl	ENSG00000141577	ENSMUSG00000039781
UniProt	Q9UPN4	Q62036
RefSeq (mRNA)	NM_001009811; NM_014984; NM_001319228; NM_001319229	NM_009734
RefSeq (protein)	NP_001009811; NP_001306157; NP_001306158; NP_055799	NP_033864; NP_001390635; NP_001390663
Location (UCSC)	Chr 17: 81.19 – 81.22 Mb	Chr 11: 120.06 – 120.09 Mb
PubMed search
- Wikidata
View/Edit Human	View/Edit Mouse

Centrosomal protein 131 also known as 5-azacytidine-induced protein 1 is a protein that in humans is encoded by the CEP131 gene.
