= Zal (disambiguation) =

Zāl is a legendary Iranian king from Sistan.

Zal may also refer to:

== People ==
- Zal Batmanglij (born 1981), American filmmaker
- Zal Cleminson (born 1949), Scottish guitarist
- Zal Yanovsky (1944–2002), Canadian rock musician
- Zal Khalilzad (born 1951), former US Ambassador to the UN
- Roxana Zal (born 1969), American actress
- Ari zal or Isaac Luria (1534–1572), rabbi and Jewish mystic

== Places ==
- Zal, Iran, a village in East Azerbaijan Province, Iran
- Pichoy Airport, Valdivia, Chile
- Iksal, Zal was older name for Iksal
- Qalay-I-Zal District, in Afghanistan

== Other uses ==
- Iranian frigate Alborz, once named after Zāl
- Pseudophilautus zal, species of frog in Sri Lanka
- ZAL, the ISO 4217 currency code for the South African financial rand
- Yeshivah Gedolah Zal, The Rabbinical College of Australia and New Zealand
- Zonal auxiliary language, a type of constructed language
