= MTCL2 =

Protein-coding gene in humans

Identifiers
- Aliases: MTCL2, C20orf117, KIAA0889, SOGA, suppressor of glucose, autophagy associated 1, SOGA1, microtubule crosslinking factor 2
- External IDs: MGI: 2444575; GeneCards: MTCL2

Gene location (Human)
Chr.	Chromosome 20 (human)
Band	20q11.23	Start	36,777,447 bp
Band	20q11.23	End	36,863,538 bp

Gene location (Mouse)
Chr.	Chromosome 2 (mouse)
Band	2|2 H1	Start	156,857,719 bp
Band	2|2 H1	End	156,921,174 bp
RNA expression pattern
Bgee	Human / Mouse (ortholog); Top expressed in: cerebellum; cerebellar cortex; cerebellar hemisphere; right hemisphere of cerebellum; myocardium of left ventricle; cardiac muscle tissue of right atrium; sural nerve; ganglionic eminence; cerebellar vermis; lower lobe of lung / Top expressed in: lumbar subsegment of spinal cord; genital tubercle; tail of embryo; cerebellar cortex; ventricular zone; ganglionic eminence; dentate gyrus of hippocampal formation granule cell; ascending aorta; otic vesicle; epiblast; More reference expression data
BioGPS	n/a
Gene ontology
Molecular function	molecular function
Cellular component	extracellular region; extracellular exosome; extracellular space
Biological process	negative regulation of gluconeogenesis; insulin receptor signaling pathway; regulation of autophagy
Sources:Amigo / QuickGO
Orthologs
Databases	NCBI: entry; OMA: entry
Species	Human	Mouse
Entrez	140710	320706
Ensembl	ENSG00000149639	ENSMUSG00000055485
UniProt	O94964	E1U8D0; A2ACV6
RefSeq (mRNA)	NM_199181; NM_080627; NM_152257	NM_001164663
RefSeq (protein)	NP_542194; NP_954650	NP_001158135
Location (UCSC)	Chr 20: 36.78 – 36.86 Mb	Chr 2: 156.86 – 156.92 Mb
PubMed search
- Wikidata
View/Edit Human	View/Edit Mouse

Microtubule cross-linking factor 2 is a protein that in humans is encoded by the MTCL2 gene (previously SOGA1). This microtubule protein is involved in chromosome segregation. It has also been known as SOGA family member 1 or suppressor of glucose, autophagy-associated protein 1.
