= Alz (disambiguation) =

Alz or ALZ may refer to:

- Alzheimer's disease (shorthand "ALZ" used by Alzheimer's Association)
- Alz, a river in Bavaria, Germany
- ALZip, a computer archive and compression utility
- Alitak Seaplane Base, a seaplane base with the IATA code ALZ
- ALZ (steelworks), Belgian steelworks
- Alur language (ISO 639-3 language code alz)
- The Armée de Liberation de Zgharta (ALZ), Lebanese political party and militia
