= Laz =

Laz or LAZ may refer to:

== Places ==
=== Czech Republic ===
- Láz (Příbram District), a municipality and village in the Central Bohemian Region
- Láz (Třebíč District), a municipality and village in the Vysočina Region
- Láz, a village and part of Nová Pec in the South Bohemian Region
- Láz, a village and part of Radomyšl in the South Bohemian Region

=== France ===
- Laz, Finistère

=== Germany ===
- Lohsa (Sorbian: Łaz)

=== Iran ===
- Laz, Iran, a village in Hormozgan Province

=== Montenegro ===
- Laz, Montenegro

=== Poland ===
- Łaz, Masovian Voivodeship
- Łaz, Żary County
- Łaz, Zielona Góra County

=== Romania ===
- Laz (river), Arad County
- Laz, a village in Săsciori Commune, Alba County
- Laz, a village in Vințu de Jos Commune, Alba County
- Laz, a village in Dezna Commune, Arad County
- Laz-Firtănuș and Laz-Șoimuș, villages in Avrămești Commune, Harghita County

== People ==
- Laz people of the Black Sea area
  - Laz language

=== First name ===
- Laz Alonso (born 1975), American actor
- Laz Barrera (1924–1991), Cuban-born American racehorse trainer
- Laz-D (born 1982), American rapper
- Laz Díaz (born 1963), American baseball umpire

=== Surname ===
- Don Laz (1929–1997), American pole vaulter
- Wolfgang Laz (1514–1565), Austrian humanist
- Jesse Laz (born 1983), American musician with the band Locksley

== Other uses ==
- .laz computer file format, used to compress and transfer Lidar data, used interchangeably with the .las format
- Laz language, spoken by the Laz people of Turkey and Georgia
- LAZ, ICAO code for Balkan Bulgarian Airlines
- LAZ, brand name for the Lviv Bus Factory
- Laz, wife of the Babylonian god Nergal
- Laz Lackerson, a fictional character in the television series Life on a Stick

== See also ==
- Lazu (disambiguation)
- Lazarus (disambiguation)
