= C&A (disambiguation) =

C&A is a multinational conglomerate of retail clothing stores.

C&A may also refer to:

- C&A (cycling team)
- C&A, a fictional company in The Amazing Digital Circus
- Camden and Amboy Railroad
- Casey and Andy
- Certification and accreditation
- Chicago and Alton Railroad
- Coal & Allied
- Cowboys and Aliens (disambiguation)
