= Love Is Hell =

Love Is Hell may refer to:

- Love Is Hell, a Life in Hell anthology by cartoonist Matt Groening
- Love Is Hell (Kitchens of Distinction album), 1989
- Love Is Hell (Ryan Adams album), 2004
- Love Is Hell (Phora album), 2018
