= The White Horses =

1965 television series

- Written by: Hanns Wiedmann, Vladimir Carin, Gitta von Cetto
- Directed by: Hanns Wiedmann
- Starring: Helga Anders: Julia; Helmuth Schneider: Dimitri; Franz Muxeneder: Hugo
- Opening theme: Ivo Robić instrumental version
- Composer: Bojan Adamič
- Countries of origin: West Germany; Yugoslavia
- Original language: German
- No. of seasons: 1
- No. of episodes: 13

Production
- Producers: Hirschfilm, Munich; Triglav Film, Ljubljana
- Cinematography: Günter Senftleben, Manfred Ensinger, Ivan Belec
- Running time: 25

Original release
- Release: 12 September 1966 – 27 February 1967

The White Horses (Slovenian: Počitnice v Lipici) is a 1965 television series co-produced by RTV Ljubljana (now RTV Slovenija) of Yugoslavia and German television station Südwestfunk.

== Plotline ==
The story follows the adventures of a teenage girl Julia (Helga Anders) who leaves Belgrade to spend a holiday on a stud farm run by her Uncle Dimitri (Helmuth Schneider), where with the help of head groom Hugo (Franz Muxeneder), white Lipizzaner horses are raised.

In the first episode, stallion Boris is stolen by Romani people who dye his white coat brown so that no one will recognise him. Julia and Hugo set off to find Boris and upon his recovery an affinity is formed between girl and horse.

== Production ==
The series, also known as Ferien in Lipizza ("Holidays in Lipica") in German, comprised thirteen 25-minute black and white episodes.

An English-dubbed version was broadcast in the United Kingdom on BBC One. The series was re-run in the 1970s, but the tapes were eventually wiped by the BBC.

== Episodes ==
1. Black and White
2. Dangerous Depths
3. Suspicion falls on Andrej
4. Thais becomes a Mother
5. Horses Stampede
6. About Bajazzo
7. The Horse Cure
8. A Dog's Life
9. Business Friend
10. The Sava Prize
11. Buried Treasure
12. The Squirrel
13. House Arrest for Othello

== Theme song ==
The theme song to the German version was played by Ivo Robić.

The UK theme song - written by Michael Carr and Ben Nisbet and later back dubbed onto all versions, was simply titled "White Horses", and credited to "Jacky" - was sung by Irish-born Jackie Lee. It became a top 10 hit in the UK charts in April 1968. The book The Penguin Television Companion claimed it to be the best television theme in history. It has been copied and used many times since, including:

- The theme was covered in 1968 by Claudine Longet, as a B-side to the single "Nothing to Lose".
- Trixie's Big Red Motorbike covered the song on their second John Peel session in 1983.
- Scottish female group Sophisticated Boom Boom covered the song in 1982 on their Peel Session.
- Jamie Wednesday recorded the track for their EP "Vote for Love" in 1987.
- The Trashcan Sinatras featured a version of the song on their EP Circling the Circumference (1990)
- The English band Kitchens of Distinction recorded a cover of the theme song during the sessions for their fourth album, Cowboys and Aliens (1994). The song was first released in the UK as a b-side on the album's first single, "Now It's Time to Say Goodbye"; it was later released in the US as a b-side on the album's title track
- Morwenna Banks released a cover version in 1995 as her Absolutely character, The Little Girl.
- The film Me Without You (2001) used the Jacky "stereo" version on its opening credits, and a version by Lucy Street during the end credits
- Cerys Matthews performed the song on the compilation Songs for the Young at Heart (2007)
- The theme was covered by Dean and Britta on their album Back Numbers (2007)
- The theme was covered by Mari Wilson on her album Pop Deluxe (2016)
