= CUJZEK Stud =

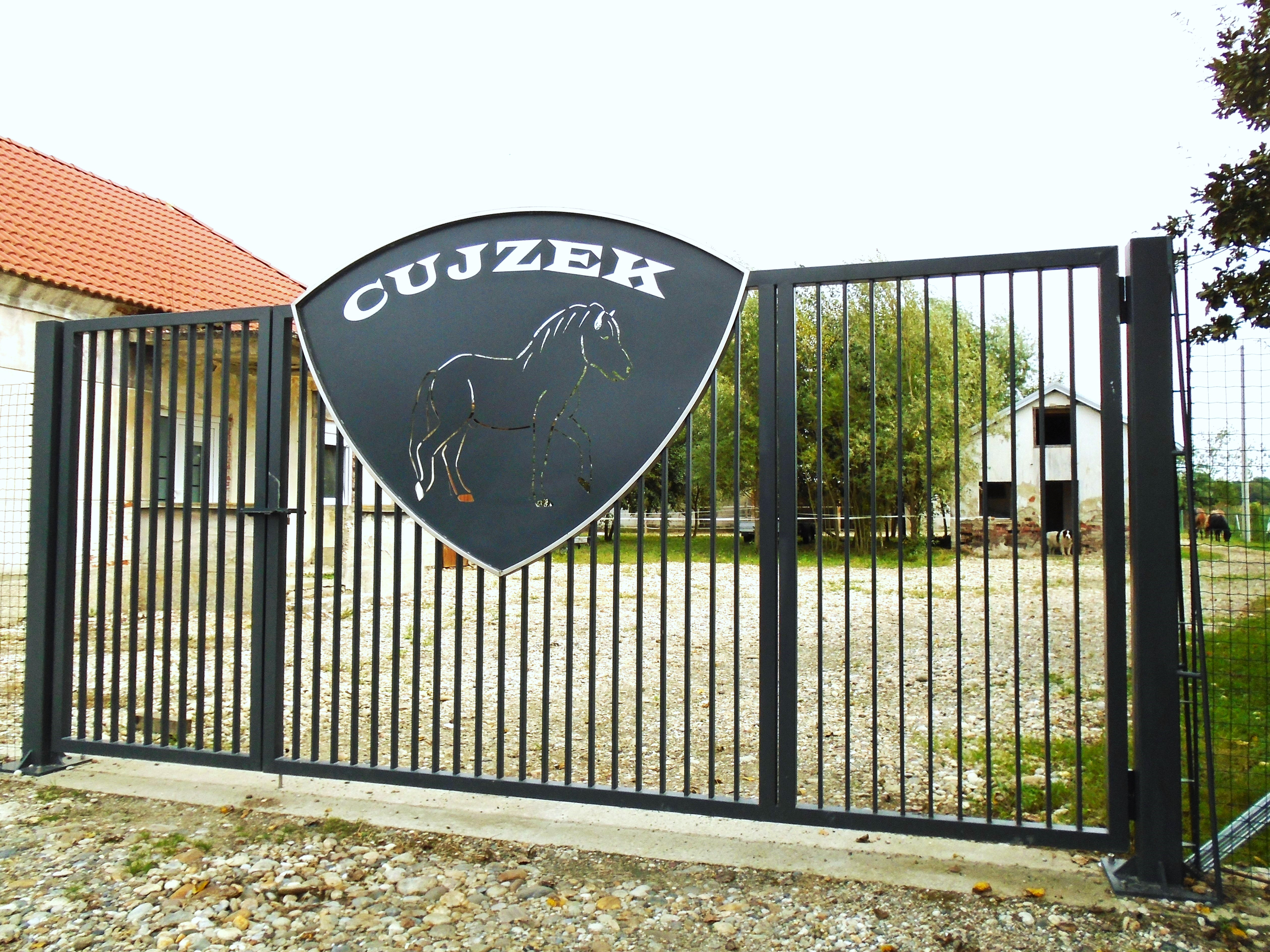
- Stud entrance
- Country: Croatia
- State:County: Međimurje County
- Acreage: ~20
- Established: 2020
- Founder: Nonprofit organization

46.4033°N 16.3272°E

CUJZEK Stud (Croatian: Ergela CUJZEK), meaning "Center for breeding and protection of the Međimurje horse" (Croatian: Centar za uzgoj i zaštitu međimurskog konja) is a small stud farm comprising around 20 acres in western part of Međimurje County, Croatia. It is located at the Macinec village in the Nedelišće municipality.

== Establishment and development ==
Established on 23 April 2020, CUJZEK Stud is opened for the development of Međimurje horse breeding in order to help preserve and revitalize this breed, one of Croatian medium-heavy horse breeds of draught horse which is particularly endangered today. In the first half of 2024, about fifteen mares, stallions and foals of the Međimurje horse were housed at that location.

Stud is formed as a nonprofit organization based in Macinec, because there are better capacities and potentials for horse breeding there than in the previously established Međimurje horse stud farm in Žabnik. The selected location meets most of the conditions required for the establishment of a leading stud farm, and is located along the right (eastern) side of the road that connects Macinec with Gornji Mihaljevec.

After registration, activities were undertaken to arrange and equip the farm brick building where the horses will be housed, as well as to adapt the fenced outdoor area of the entire complex where the animals will move. Given the equipment and content, CUJZEK Stud has the potential to become part of the attractive tourist offer of Međimurje County, although it has not yet been open to the general public since its establishment.

== Gallery ==
Chestnut mare grazing	Mares	Stable

== See also ==
- List of horse breeds
- Alkars' Stud
- Đakovo Stud
- Lipik Stud
- Međimurje Horse Stud, Žabnik
