= Đakovo Stud =

Horse stud farm in Croatia

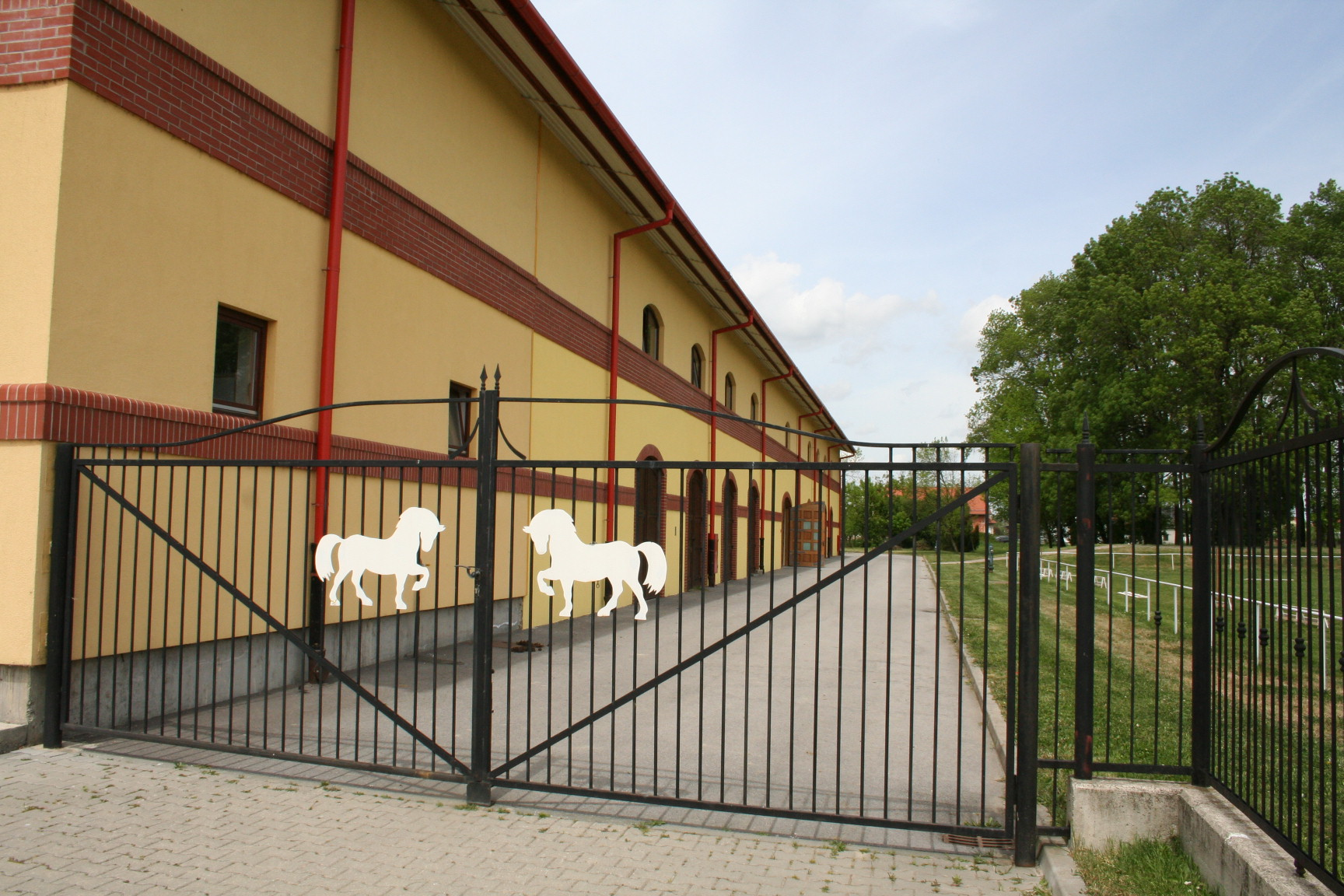
- Đakovo Stud exterior
- Country: Croatia
- County: Osijek-Baranja County
- Acreage: 790 (320 hectares)
- Established: 1506
- Founder: Bishop Mijo Mesarić

The Đakovo Stud (Croatian: Ergela Đakovo) is a Croatian Lipizzan horse national breeding stud farm located in Đakovo, Osijek-Baranja County, eastern Slavonia. First mentioned in 1239 and 1244, it officially originated in 1506, as it was written that Bishop Mijo Mesarić „owned a stud farm of 90 Arab horses“ on his estate. In recent times, it has developed into an important breeding farm, which comprises today approximately 790 acres of land and breeds as many as 160 horses in the Town of Đakovo and its surroundings.

== History ==
The stud has been founded by Bosnian-Syrmian bishops who held estates in Đakovo granted by Coloman, King of Halych and Herceg (Duke) of Slavonia in 1239. This charter was confirmed by another charter issued in 1244 by the Croato-Hungarian King Bela IV (III).

There is a document from 1374, confirming the horse breeding, issued on the occasion of the wedding of Tvrtko Kotromanić, Ban of Bosnia (later the first King of Bosnia), and Bulgarian Princess Dorothea, which was held in Đakovo.

However, it is 1506, that is considered to be the year of foundation of the stud, as the word „stud“ was mentioned in a document according to which the Bishop Mijo Mesarić owned 90 Arabian horses. In 1524 the number of horses increased to 130, but soon it all disappeared in a disaster. The bishop and most of his horses were killed in the battle of Mohács in 1526 and in very short time after that, the Ottomans overtook the stud and the whole Đakovo area.

In 1687, during the Great Turkish War, Đakovo was freed from the Ottomans and the stud was reestablished soon. Bishop Đuro Patačić bought new stallions and mares in 1706 to enable horse breeding for military purpose in the frontier area. There were 375 horses in total in the stud in 1719, as Bishop Petar Bakić bought 30 new Arabian horses.

At the beginning of the 19th century, the introduction of Lipizzan breeding started in Đakovo, as first horses were brought from Lipica in 1806. In the second half of the 19th century, when Josip Juraj Strossmayer became Bishop of Đakovo, Lipizzan horses were the only breed held in the Đakovo Stud. In 1900 the stud possessed 288 horses and in 1912 Bishop Ivan Krapac had a subsidiary stud in Ivandvor built.

After the Second World War the stud was a part of the PIK Đakovo (Agricultural & Industrial Combinat), a socialist kind of economic organization in former Yugoslavia.

Today the stud is a horse farm of national importance for Croatia. In 2010 it was administratively merged with the Lipik Stud from the western Slavonia.

== Foundation stallions and mares ==
The stud's foundation stallion lines are Pluto (from 1765), Conversano (1767), Neapolitano (1770), Maestoso (1773), Favory (1779), Siglavy (1810) and Tulipan (1860). The mare lines bred in Đakovo are: Allegra, Batosta, Gaetana, Krabbe, Mara, Mima, Montenegra, Munja, Santa, Slavonia, Toplica, Trofetta and Zenta.

== Locations ==
The Đakovo Stud operates two facilities. The first one, located in the Town of Đakovo itself, is a stallion breeding station. It maintains 30 to 40 stallions during the year. The second one is situated in Ivandvor, 6.5 kilometres from Đakovo, where there are around 120 Lipizzans of various age and sex categories.

== Gallery ==
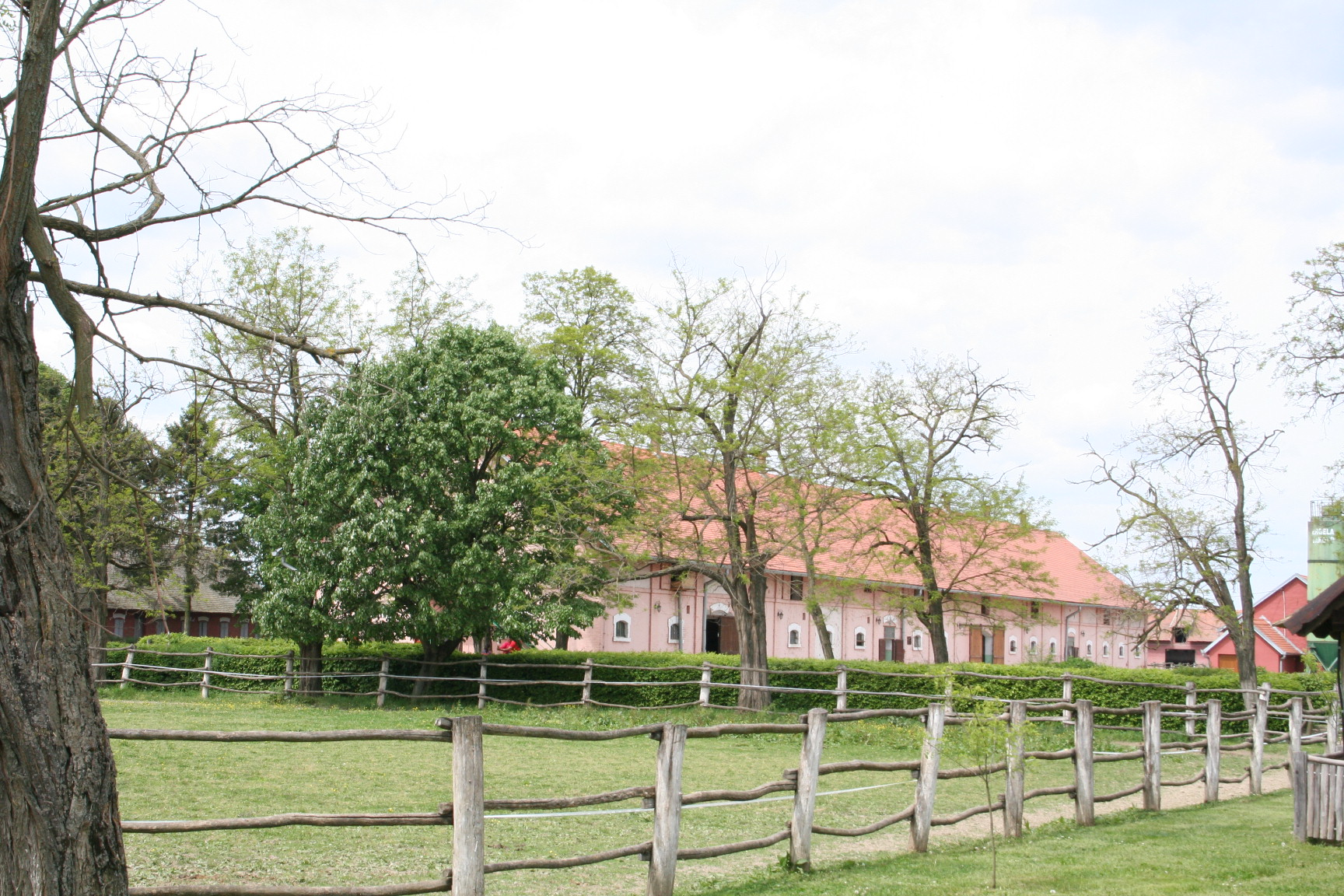
Location Ivandvor

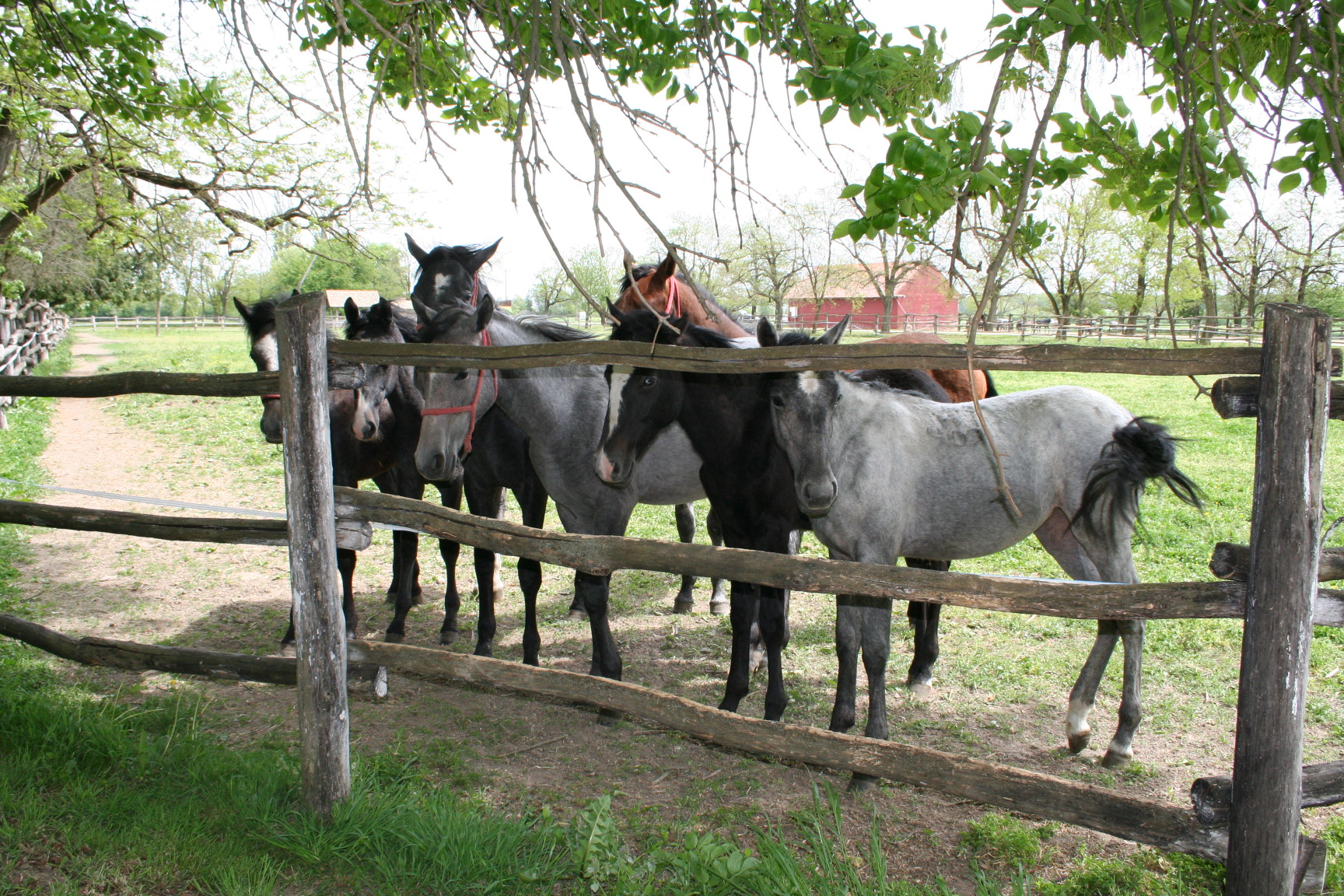
Young Lipizzans

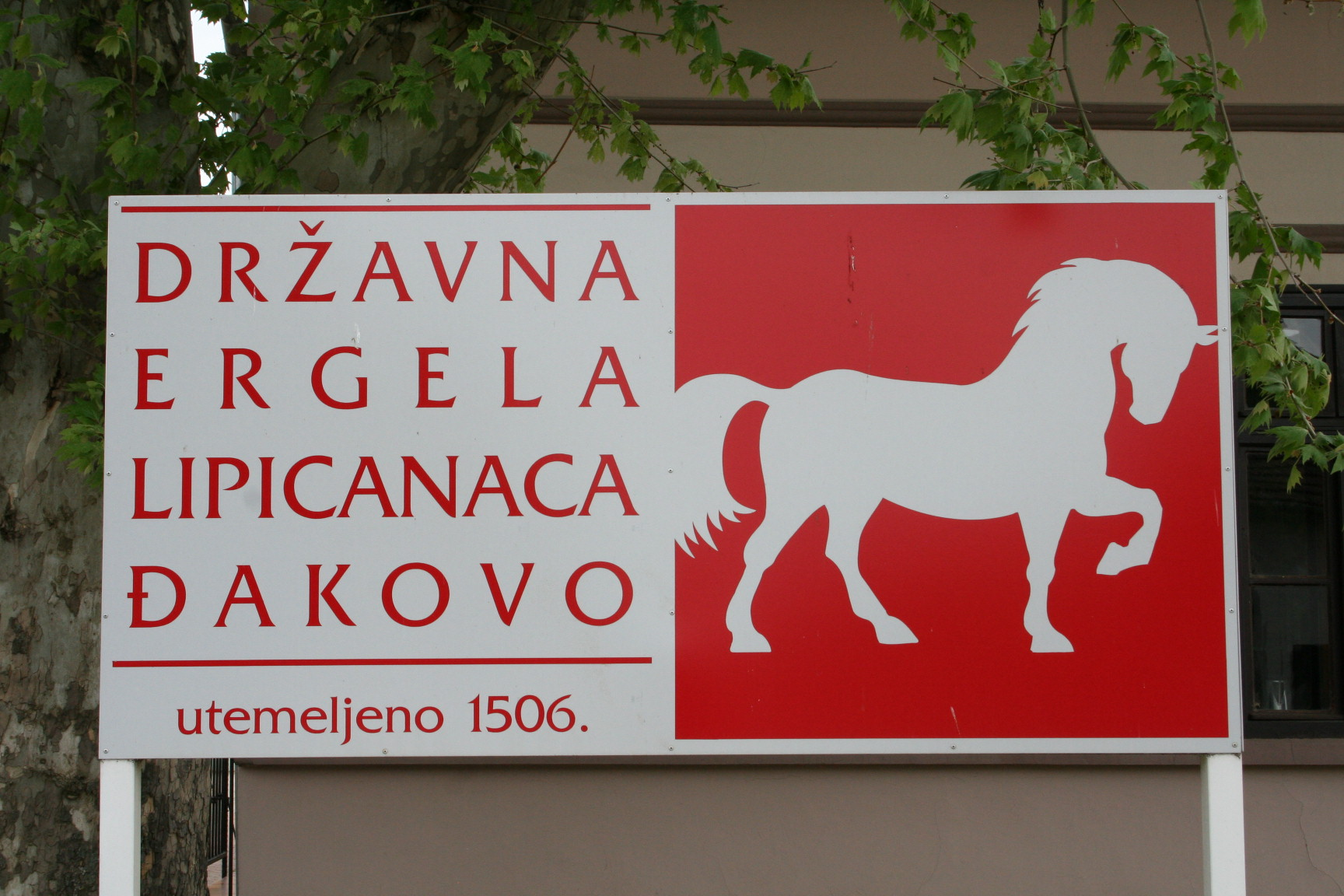
Stud sign

== See also ==
- Alkars' Stud
- Lipik Stud
- Međimurje Horse Stud, Žabnik
- CUJZEK Stud
- Lipica Stud Farm
