= The Death of Cool =

Studio album by Kitchens of Distinction
- Released: 3 August 1992
- Recorded: 1991–92
- Studio: Sawmills Studio, Golant, Cornwall
- Genre: Shoegaze, dream pop
- Length: 52:27
- Label: One Little Indian
- Producer: Hugh Jones

Kitchens of Distinction chronology
Strange Free World (1991)	The Death of Cool (1992)	Cowboys and Aliens (1994)

Singles from The Death of Cool
- 1. "Breathing Fear" Released: May 1992; 2. "When in Heaven" Released: August 1992; 3. "Smiling" Released: September 1992 (promo only); 4. "4 Men" Released: October 1992 (promo only)

Professional ratings
Review scores
Source	Rating
AllMusic	4.5/5 stars
Select	4/5

The Death of Cool is the third studio album from British alternative rock band Kitchens of Distinction, released on 3 August 1992 in the UK by One Little Indian Records and a day later in the US by A&M Records. The album is the follow-up to 1991's Strange Free World and was once again produced by Hugh Jones.

While considered by most fans to be their strongest effort, the album was largely ignored by the general public in the midst of the popularity of grunge rock in 1992, peaking at number 72 on the UK Albums Chart.

AllMusic critic Ned Raggett praises the album as a "multifaceted, deeply felt hour of music that is easily the equal of such similar masterpieces of post-punk guitar rock as The Chameleons' Script of the Bridge and The Sound's Heads and Hearts."

Lead singer Patrick Fitzgerald said this of the album:

People didn't understand the album...and it sold half of Strange Free World. It was too dark and gloomy and questioning, this being the height of Madchester and E. You had "...Tooting Broadway" and the queer-bashing scenario of "Breathing Fear," the AIDS death song of "When in Heaven"...perhaps a little challenging for its time...

== Track listing ==
All tracks are written by Kitchens of Distinction

No.	Title	Length
1.	"What Happens Now?"	4:33
2.	"4 Men"	4:11
3.	"On Tooting Broadway Station"	5:04
4.	"Breathing Fear"	3:43
5.	"Gone World Gone"	7:59
6.	"When in Heaven"	5:14
7.	"Mad as Snow"	7:21
8.	"Smiling"	3:22
9.	"Blue Pedal"	7:35
10.	"Can't Trust the Waves" (lead vocal by Julian Swales)	3:25

== Singles ==
- "Breathing Fear" (May 1992)
  - CD and 12" single:
  1. "Breathing Fear"
  2. "Goodbye Voyager"
  3. "Skin"
  4. "Airshifting"
  - 7" single:
  1. "Breathing Fear"
  2. "Goodbye Voyager"
- "When in Heaven" (August 1992)
  1. "When in Heaven"
  2. "Glittery Dust"
  3. "Don't Come Back"
  4. "Spacedolphins"

== Personnel ==
Kitchens of Distinction

- Patrick Fitzgerald – vocals, bass
- Julian Swales – guitar, vocals
- Dan Goodwin – drums, percussion

with:

- Katie Meehan – vocals on "4 Men"
- Caroline Lavelle – cello on "Breathing Fear"
- Tim Sanders – soprano saxophone on "Can't Trust the Waves"

Technical

- Hugh Jones – producer, engineer, percussion on "Gone World Gone"
- John Cornfield – assistant engineer
- Dylan Spalding – tape operator
- Helen Woodward – mixing engineer
- Simon Van Zwanenberg – assistant mixing engineer
- Colin Bell – photography
- Brent Linley – backgrounds
- Sleeve design by Cactus
- Mixed at The Roundhouse, London
- Mastered at Tape One
