= Alkars' Stud =

Horse stud farm in Croatia

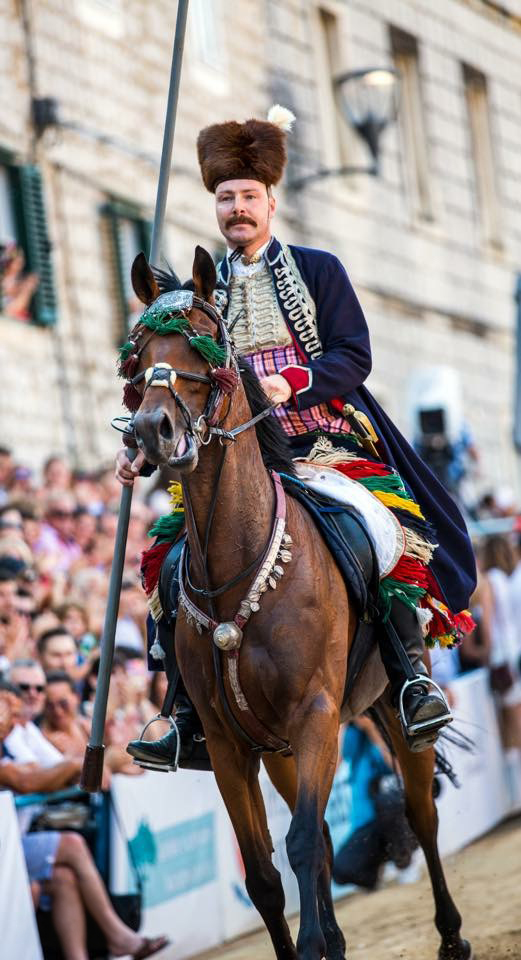
- A horse from the Alkars’ Stud at the Sinjska alka competition
- Country: Croatia
- State:County: Split-Dalmatia County
- Acreage: 24
- Purchased:Established: 2004
- Owner:Founder: „Alka Knights' Society“
- Website: alka.hr/en/alka-society/alkars-stud-farm-c9

Alkars' Stud (Croatian: Alkarska ergela) is a horse breeding farm founded in 2004 in Sinj, Split-Dalmatia County, Croatia. Its main purpose is breeding of high-quality horses for Sinjska alka equestrian competitions. It is situated at the Sinj hippodrome, where approximately forty horses have been housed, mostly of the English Thoroughbred and Croatian Warmblood breeds.

== Establishment and development ==
The main initiator and founder of the stud is the „Alka Knights' Society" ("Viteško Alkarsko društvo" – VAD) from Sinj, which, due to the specific situation caused by the gradual reduction of horse breeding on private peasant properties, decided to organize its own breeding programme. In 2004 the private limited company named "Alkarska ergela d.o.o." was registered and several employees were engaged. The representatives of the VAD-Society agreed with the |local authorities that the stud would be located in the area of the Sinj hippodrome, the central place for keeping and training horses in Split-Dalmatia County. The hippodrome is situated in the eastern part of the town and there are four equestrian clubs from the wider area of Sinj which have their riding schools on it.

The establishment of the stud was supported by the Ministry of Agriculture and the Split-Dalmatia County, and these institutions still co-finance Alkars activities today. In the first year after its establishment, the stud began to function with five breeding mares, and later its own breeding programme gradually increased. In addition, the stud assigns its stallions to interested private owners of registered mares and thus stimulates horse breeding in Dalmatia.

== Breeding and features of horses ==
The breeding and maintenance of quality horses in the stud are important to ensure the high level of the significant event that takes place every year at the beginning of August – Sinjska alka competition. A quality horse must meet a number of requirements, because the competition takes place in specific conditions. Horses have to reach a certain speed, because they must run the 160-metre track in no more than 13 seconds. Furthermore, the racetrack is only 5 metres wide, and there are people on both sides of it, so the horse must be trained to put up with different sounds, movements, colours and generally unusual atmosphere without any problems.

Horses bred in the stud, in addition to speed, must have a calm and even run, and a calm temperament. They are trained not to be afraid of sudden situations, such as, for example, the shot of a cannon called ‘’mačkule’’ during competition. All horses in the stud are not of the same height and weight, so they are adjusted to the proportions of the rider. Taller and heavier horses are chosen for higher and heavier alkars, and vice versa. There are alkars that are up to two meters tall, and they ride horses that have a height of back about 180 cm. Besides, relationship between rider and horse must be full of trust. Therefore, the alkar must be in the stable with his horse more often throughout the year, as well as take him out for a walk.

== See also ==
- Đakovo Stud
- Lipik Stud
- Međimurje Horse Stud, Žabnik
- CUJZEK Stud
