= Cowboys and Aliens =

Cowboys and Aliens or Cowboys & Aliens may refer to:

- Cowboys & Aliens (comics), a 2006 Platinum Studios graphic novel
  - Cowboys & Aliens, a 2011 American science fiction Western film, inspired by the comic
    - Cowboys & Aliens, a novelization of the film by Joan D. Vinge
- Cowboys and Aliens (album), a 1994 album by British alternative rock/dream pop group Kitchens of Distinction
- "Cowboys & Aliens," a song by Gram Rabbit from their 2004 album, Music to Start a Cult To
- Cowboys & Aliens (band), a Belgium stoner rock band
