= Lipizzan =

Horse breed noted for use in the Spanish Riding School in Vienna

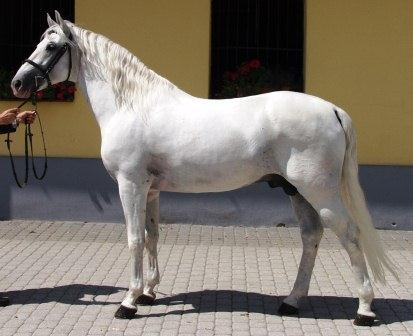
- Other names: Lipizzaner, Karster
- Country of origin: Developed by the House of Habsburg from Arab, Barb, Spanish and Neapolitan stock. Today associated with the nations of Austria, Bosnia and Herzegovina, Croatia, Hungary, and Slovenia.

Traits
- Height: 14.2 and 15.2 hands (58 and 62 inches, 147 and 157 cm)
- Distinguishing features: Compact, muscular, mostly but not exclusively gray in color, popularly associated with the Spanish Riding School.

Breed standards
- Verband der Lipizzanerzüchter in Österreich (Austria); Lipizzan International Federation; Other nations; United States Lipizzan Federation; Slovenian Lipizzaner Breeding Association

The Lipizzan or Lipizzaner (Croatian: Lipicanac, Czech: Lipicán, German: Lipizzaner, Hungarian: Lipicai, Italian: Lipizzano, Serbian: Lipicaner, Slovene: Lipicanec) is a European breed of riding horse developed in the Habsburg Empire in the sixteenth century. It is a muscular horse, powerful, slow to mature and long-lived; the coat is usually gray.

The name of the breed derives from that of the village of Lipica (Italian: Lipizza), which was part of the Habsburg empire at the time the breed was developed, now in Slovenia, one of the earliest stud farms established; the stud farm there is still active. The breed has been endangered numerous times by warfare sweeping Europe, including during the War of the First Coalition, World War I, and World War II. The rescue of the Lipizzans during World War II by Allied troops was made famous by the Disney movie Miracle of the White Stallions.

The Lipizzaner is closely associated with the Spanish Riding School of Vienna, Austria, where the horses demonstrate the haute école or "high school" movements of classical dressage, including the highly controlled, stylized jumps and other movements known as the "airs above the ground". These horses are mostly bred at the Piber Federal Stud, near Graz, Austria, and are trained using traditional methods of classical dressage that date back hundreds of years.

Eight stallions are recognized as the classic foundation bloodstock of the breed, all foaled in the late eighteenth and early nineteenth centuries. All modern Lipizzans trace their bloodlines to these eight stallions, and all breeding stallions have included in their name the name of the foundation sire of their bloodline. Also classic mare lines are known, with up to 35 recognized by various breed registries. The majority of horses are registered through the member organizations of the Lipizzan International Federation, which covers almost 11,000 horses in 19 countries and at 9 state studs in Europe. Most Lipizzans reside in Europe, with smaller numbers in the Americas, South Africa, and Australia.

Lipizzan horse breeding traditions are recognized by UNESCO and inscribed on the Representative List of the Intangible Cultural Heritage of Humanity.

== Characteristics ==
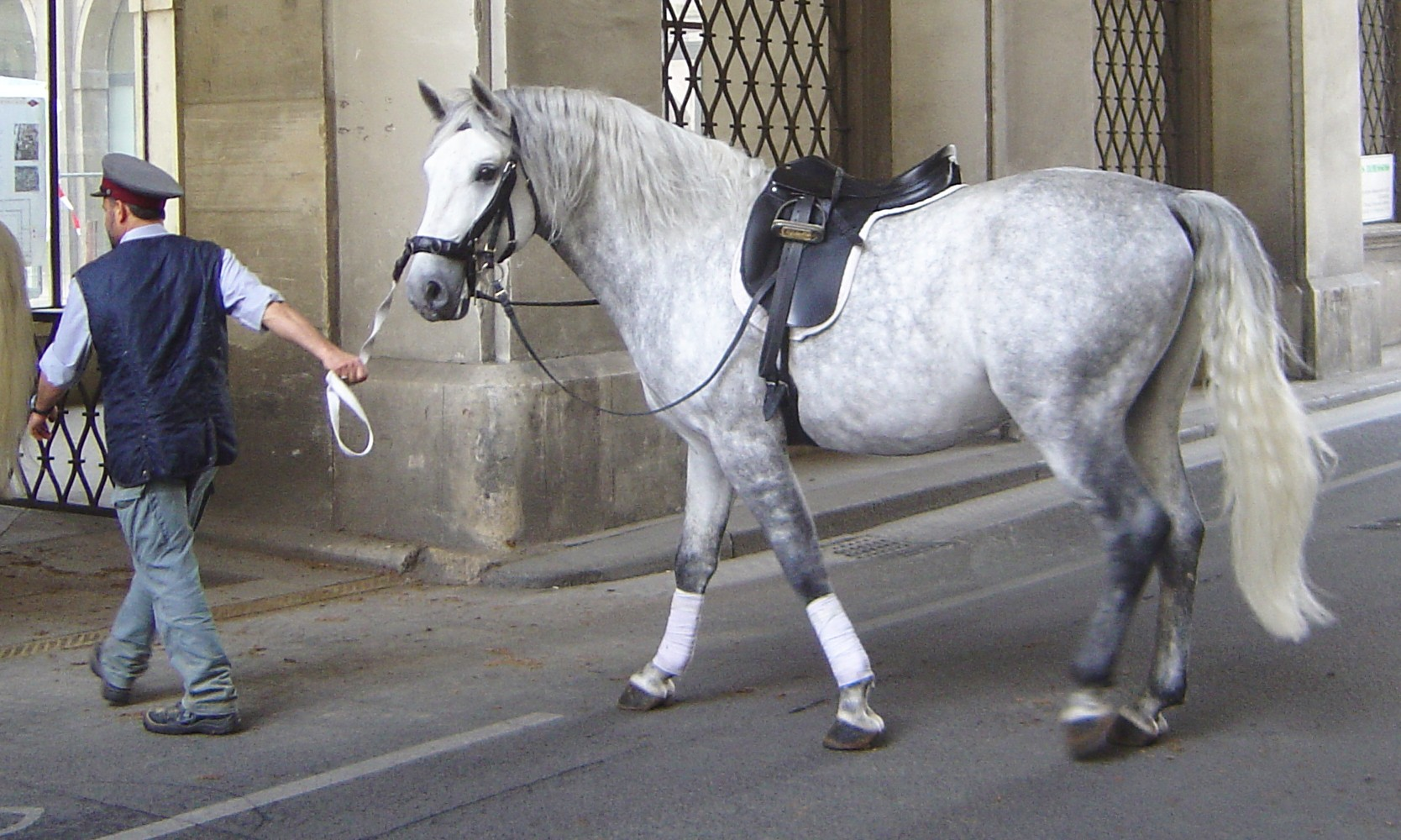
Young Lipizzan stallion midway through the graying process

Most adult Lipizzans measure between 14.2 and 15.2 hands (58 and 62 inches, 147 and 157 cm). However, horses bred to be closer to the original carriage-horse type are taller, approaching 16.1 hands (65 inches, 165 cm). Lipizzans have a long head, with a straight or slightly convex profile. The jaw is deep, the ears small, the eyes large and expressive, and the nostrils flared. They have a neck that is sturdy, yet arched and withers that are low, muscular, and broad. They have a wide, deep chest, broad croup, and muscular shoulder. The tail is carried high and well set. The legs are well-muscled and strong, with broad joints and well-defined tendons. The feet tend to be small, but are tough.

Lipizzan horses tend to mature slowly. However, they live and are active longer than many other breeds, with horses performing the difficult exercises of the Spanish Riding School well into their 20s and living into their 30s.

=== Color ===
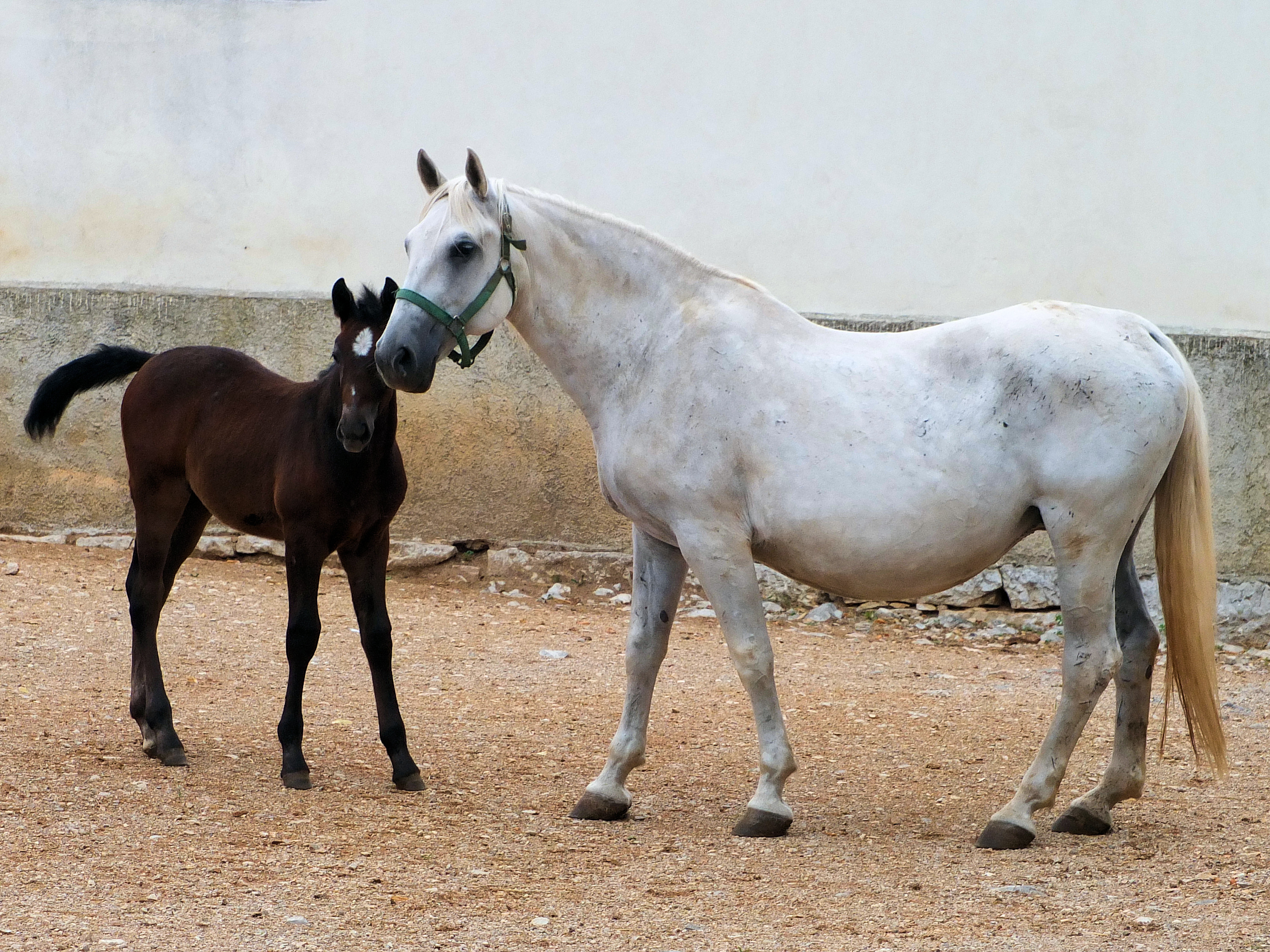
Mare and dark foal

Aside from the rare solid-colored horse (usually bay or black), most Lipizzans are gray. Like all gray horses, they have black skin, dark eyes, and as adult horses, a white hair coat. Gray horses, including Lipizzans, are born with a pigmented coat—in Lipizzans, foals are usually bay or black—and become lighter each year as the graying process takes place, with the process being complete between 6 and 10 years of age. Lipizzans are not actually true white horses, but this is a common misconception. A white horse is born white and has unpigmented skin.

Until the eighteenth century, Lipizzans had other coat colors, including dun, bay, chestnut, black, piebald, and skewbald. However, gray is a dominant gene. Gray was the color preferred by the royal family, so the color was emphasized in breeding practices. Thus, in a small breed population when the color was deliberately selected as a desirable feature, it came to be the color of the overwhelming majority of Lipizzan horses. However, it is a long-standing tradition for the Spanish Riding School to have at least one bay Lipizzan stallion in residence, and this tradition is continued through the present day.

== History ==
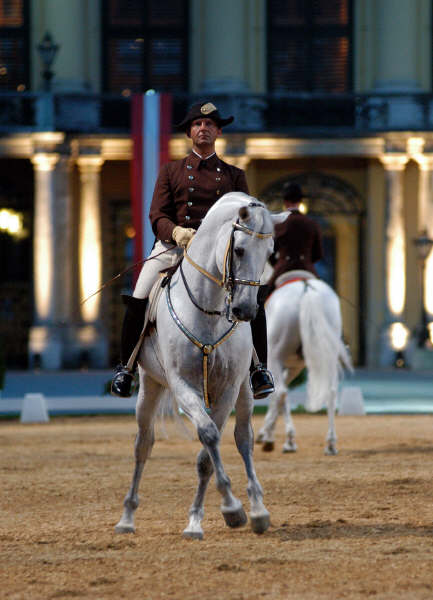
Lipizzan stallion, Schönbrunn Palace

The ancestors of the Lipizzan can be traced to around 800 AD. The earliest predecessors of the Lipizzan originated in the seventh century when Barb horses were brought into Spain by the Moors and crossed on native Spanish stock. The result was the Andalusian horse and other Iberian horse breeds.

By the sixteenth century, when the Habsburgs ruled both Spain and Austria, a powerful but agile horse was desired both for military uses and for use in the fashionable and rapidly growing riding schools for the nobility of central Europe. Therefore, in 1562, the Habsburg Emperor Maximillian II brought the Spanish Andalusian horse to Austria and founded the court stud at Kladrub. In 1580, his brother, Archduke Charles II, ruler of Inner Austria, established a similar stud at Lipizza (now Lipica), located in modern-day Slovenia, from which the breed obtained its name. When the stud farm was established, Lipizza was located within the municipal limits of Trieste, an autonomous city under Habsburg sovereignty. The name of the village itself derives from the Slovene word lipa, meaning "linden tree."

Spanish, Barb, and Arabian stock were crossed at Lipizza, and succeeding generations were crossed with the now-extinct Neapolitan breed from Italy and other horses of Spanish descent obtained from Germany and Denmark. While breeding stock was exchanged between the two studs, Kladrub specialized in producing heavy carriage horses, while riding and light carriage horses came from the Lipizza stud.

Beginning in 1920, the Piber Federal Stud, near Graz, Austria, became the main stud for the horses used in Vienna. Breeding became very selective, allowing only stallions that had proved themselves at the Riding School to stand at stud, and breeding only mares that had passed rigorous performance testing.

=== Foundation horses ===
Today, eight foundation lines for Lipizzans are recognized by various registries, which refer to them as "dynasties". They are divided into two groups. Six trace to classical foundation stallions used in the eighteenth and nineteenth centuries by the Lipizza stud, and two additional lines were not used at Lipizza, but were used by other studs within the historic boundaries of the Habsburg Empire.

The six "classical dynasties" are:

- Pluto: a gray Spanish stallion from the Royal Danish Stud, foaled in 1765
- Conversano: a black Neapolitan stallion, foaled in 1767
- Maestoso: a gray stallion from the Kladrub stud with a Spanish dam, foaled 1773, descendants today all trace via Maestoso X, foaled in Hungary in 1819
- Favory: a dun stallion from the Kladrub stud, foaled in 1779
- Neapolitano: a bay Neapolitan stallion from the Polesine, foaled in 1790
- Siglavy: a gray Arabian stallion, originally from Syria, foaled in 1810

Two additional stallion lines are found in Croatia, Hungary, and other eastern European countries, as well as in North America. They are accepted as equal to the six classical lines by the Lipizzan International Federation. These are:

- Tulipan: A black stallion foaled about 1800 from the Croatian stud farm of Terezovac, owned by Count Janković-Bésán.
- Incitato: A stallion of Spanish lines foaled 1802, bred in Transylvania by Count Bethlen, and sold to the Hungarian stud farm Mezőhegyes

Several other stallion lines have died out over the years, but were used in the early breeding of the horses. In addition to the foundation stallion lines, there were 20 "classic" mare lines, 14 of which exist today. However, up to 35 mare lines are recognized by various Lipizzan organizations.

Traditional naming patterns are used for both stallions and mares, required by Lipizzan breed registries. Stallions traditionally are given two names, with the first being the line of the sire and the second being the name of the dam. For example, "Maestoso Austria" is a horse sired by Maestoso Trompeta out of a mare named Austria. The horse's sire line traces to the foundation sire Maestoso. The names of mares are chosen to be "complementary to the traditional Lipizzan line names" and are required to end in the letter "a".

=== Spanish Riding School ===
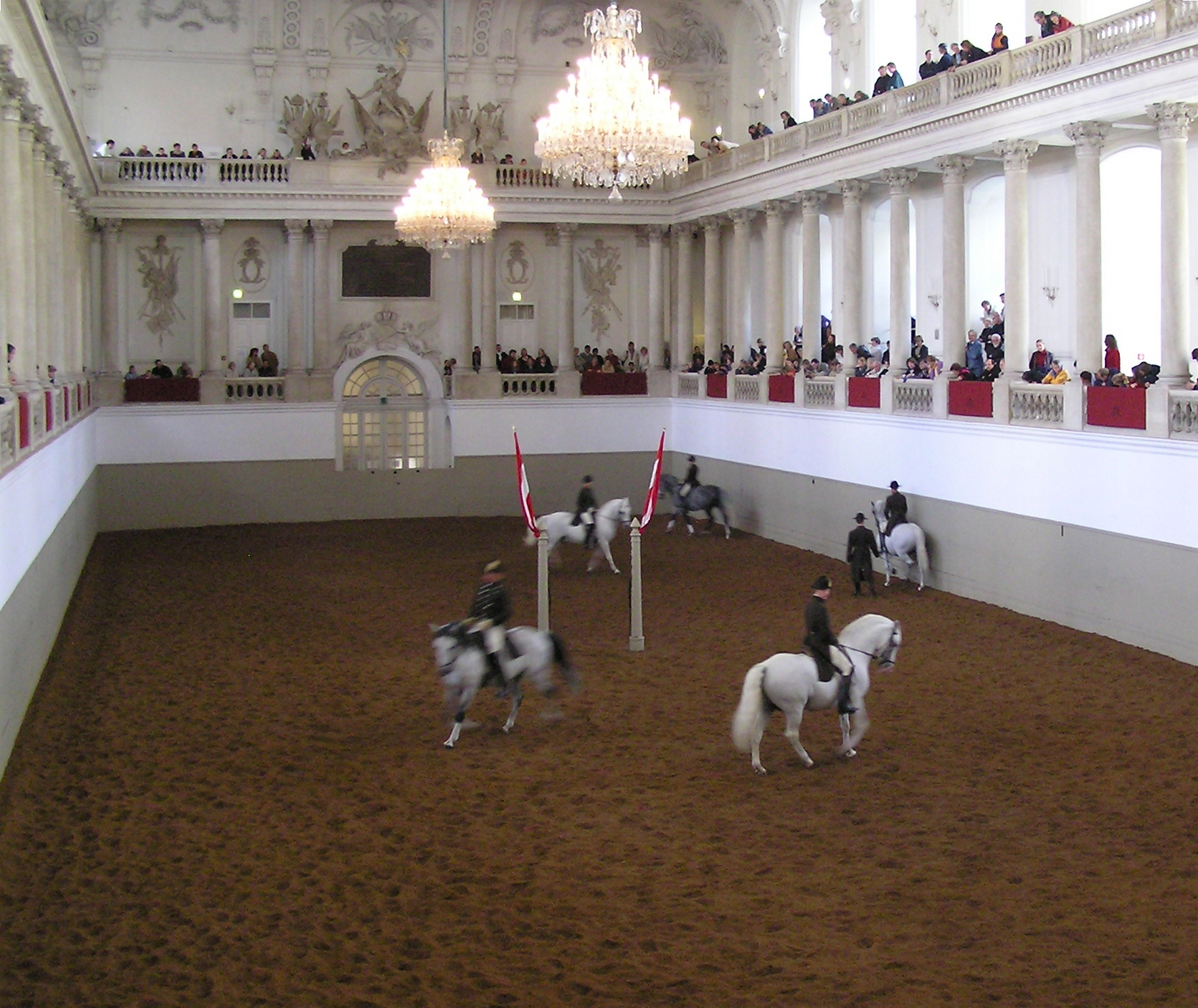
Lipizzans training at the Spanish Riding School

The Spanish Riding School uses highly trained Lipizzan stallions in public performances that demonstrate classical dressage movements and training. In 1572, the first Spanish riding hall was built, during the Austrian Empire, and is the oldest of its kind in the world. The Spanish Riding School, though located in Vienna, Austria, takes its name from the original Spanish heritage of its horses. In 1729, Charles VI commissioned the building of the Winter Riding School in Vienna and in 1735, the building was completed that remains the home of the Spanish Riding School today.

=== Wartime preservation ===
The Lipizzans endured several wartime relocations throughout their history, each of which saved the breed from extinction. The first was in March 1797 during the War of the First Coalition, when the horses were evacuated from Lipica. During the journey, 16 mares gave birth to foals. In November 1797, the horses returned to Lipica, but the stables were in ruins. They were rebuilt, but in 1805, the horses were evacuated again when Napoleon invaded Austria. They were being taken care of in Đakovo Stud. They remained away from the stud for two years, returning the 1st of April 1807, but then, following the Treaty of Schönbrunn in 1809, the horses were evacuated three more times during the unsettled period that followed, resulting in the loss of many horses and the destruction of the written studbooks that documented bloodlines of horses prior to 1700. The horses finally returned to Lipica for good in 1815, where they remained for the rest of the nineteenth century.

The first evacuation of the twentieth century occurred in 1915 when the horses were evacuated from Lipica due to World War I and placed at Laxenburg and Kladrub. Following the war, the Austro-Hungarian Empire was broken up, with Lipica becoming part of Italy. Thus, the animals were divided between several different studs in the new postwar nations of Austria, Italy, Hungary, Czechoslovakia, Romania, and Yugoslavia. The nation of Austria kept the stallions of the Spanish Riding School and some breeding stock. By 1920, the Austrian breeding stock was consolidated at Piber.

During World War II, the high command of Nazi Germany transferred most of Europe's Lipizzan breeding stock to Hostau, Czechoslovakia. The breeding stock was taken from Piber in 1942, and additional mares and foals from other European nations arrived in 1943. The stallions of the Spanish Riding School were evacuated to St. Martins, Austria, from Vienna in January 1945, when bombing raids neared the city and the head of the Spanish Riding School, Colonel Alois Podhajsky, feared the horses were in danger. By spring of 1945, the horses at Hostau were threatened by the advancing Soviet army, which might have slaughtered the animals for horse meat had it captured the facility.

The rescue of the Lipizzans by the United States Army, made famous by the Disney movie Miracle of the White Stallions, occurred in two parts: The Third United States Army, under the command of General George S. Patton, was near St. Martins in the spring of 1945 and learned that the Lipizzan stallions were in the area. Patton himself was a horseman, and like Podhajsky, had competed in the Olympic Games. On 7 May 1945, Podhajsky put on an exhibition of the Spanish Riding School stallions for Patton and Undersecretary of War Robert P. Patterson, and at its conclusion requested that Patton take the horses under his protection.

Meanwhile, the Third Army's United States Second Cavalry, a tank unit under the command of Colonel Charles Reed, had discovered the horses at Hostau, where 400 Allied prisoners of war were also being kept, and had occupied it on 28 April 1945. "Operation Cowboy", as the rescue was known, resulted in the recovery of 1,200 horses, including 375 Lipizzans. Patton learned of the raid, and arranged for Podhajsky to fly to Hostau. On 12 May, soldiers began riding, trucking, and herding the horses 56 km (35 mi) across the border into Kotztinz, Germany. The Lipizzans were eventually settled in temporary quarters in Wimsbach, until the breeding stock returned to Piber in 1952, and the stallions returned to the Spanish Riding School in 1955. In 2005, the Spanish Riding School celebrated the 60th anniversary of Patton's rescue by touring the United States.

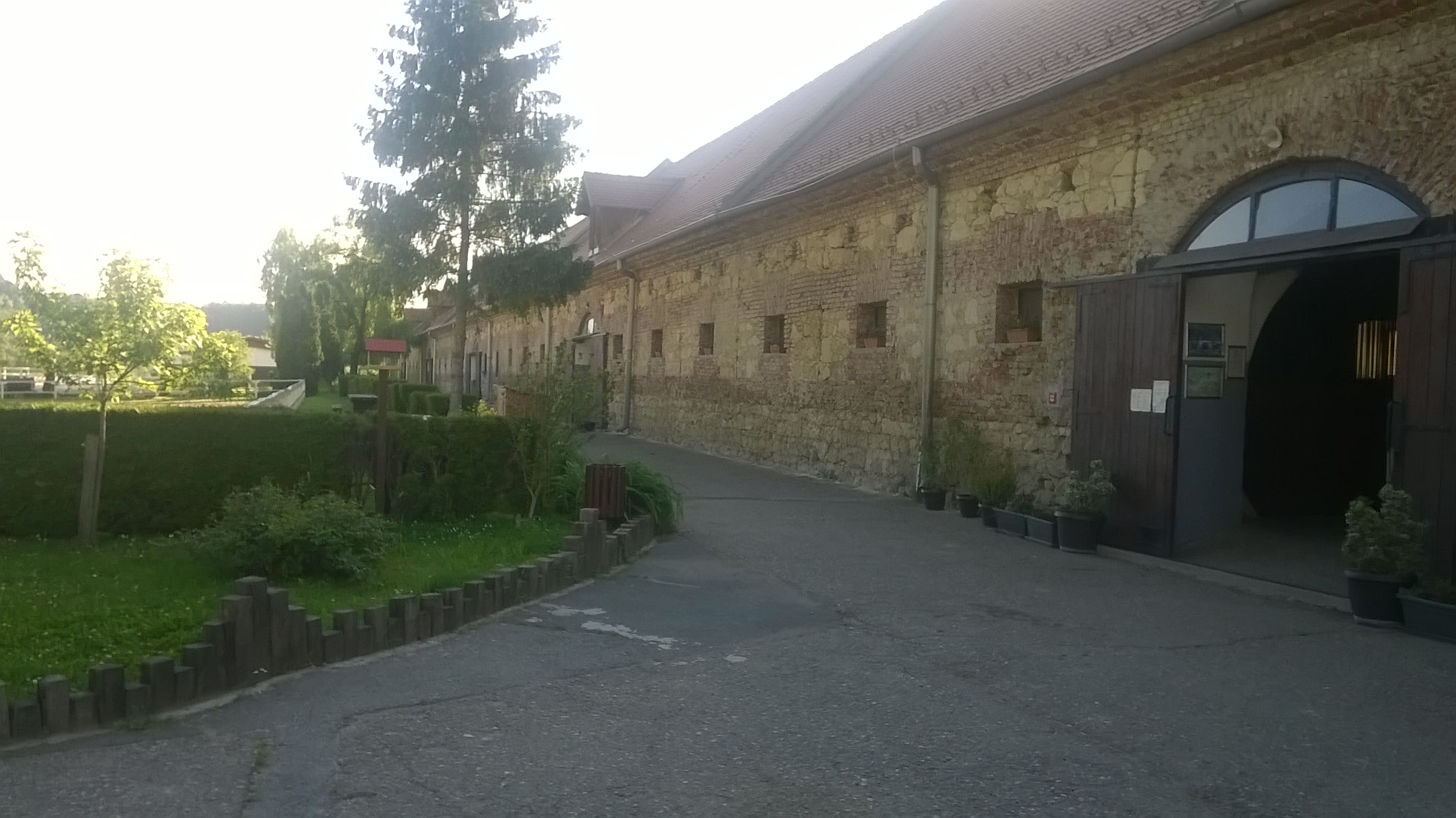
Lipik Stud, Croatia

During the Croatian War of Independence, from 1991 to 1995, the horses at the Lipik stable in Croatia were taken by the Serbs to Novi Sad, Serbia. The horses remained there until 2007, when calls began to be made for them to be returned to their country of origin. In October 2007, 60 horses were returned to Croatia.

=== Modern breed ===
The Lipizzan breed suffered a setback to its population when a viral epidemic hit the Piber Stud in 1983. Forty horses and 8% of the expected foal crop were lost. Since then, the population at the stud has increased. By 1994, 100 mares were at the stud farm and a foal crop of 56 was born in 1993. In 1994, the rate of successful pregnancy and birth of foals increased from 27 to 82%; the result of a new veterinary center. In 1996, a study funded by the European Union Indo-Copernicus Project assessed 586 Lipizzan horses from eight stud farms in Europe, with the goal of developing a "scientifically based description of the Lipizzan horse". A study of the mitochondrial DNA (mtDNA) was performed on 212 of the animals, and those studied were found to contain 37 of the 39 known mtDNA haplotypes known in modern horses, meaning that they show a high degree of genetic diversity. This had been expected, as it was known that the mare families of the Lipizzan included a large number of different breeds, including Arabians, Thoroughbreds, and other European breeds.

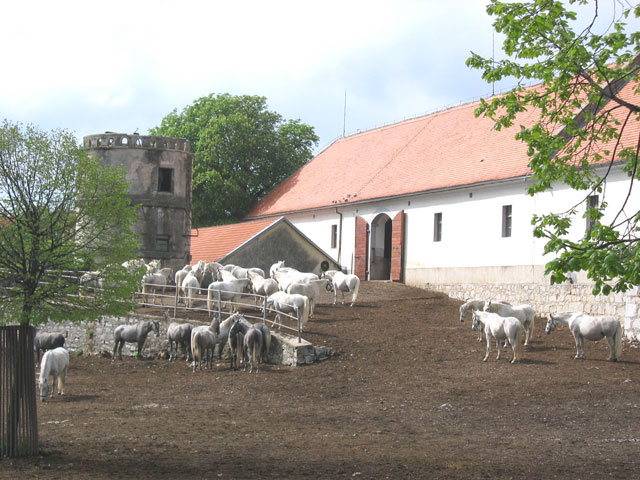
Lipica Stud Farm, Slovenia

The Lipizzan International Federation (LIF) is the international governing organization for the breed, composed of many national and private organizations representing the Lipizzan. The organizations work together under the banner of the LIF to promote the breed and maintain standards. As of 2012, almost 11,000 Lipizzans were registered with the LIF; residing with private breeders in 19 countries and at nine state studs in Europe. The largest number are in Europe, with almost 9,000 registered horses, followed by the Americas, with just over 1,700, then Africa and Australia with around 100 horses each. The nine state studs that are part of the LIF represent almost one-quarter of the horses in Europe. Sâmbăta de Jos, in Romania, has the greatest number of horses, with 400, followed by Piber in Austria (360), Lipica in Slovenia (358), Szilvásvárad in Hungary (262), Monterotondo in Italy (230), Đakovo-Lipik in Croatia (220), and Topoľčianky in Slovakia (200). The other two studs are smaller, with stud Vučijak in Bosnia near Prnjavor having 130 horses and Karađorđevo in Serbia having just 30. Educational programs have been developed to promote the breed and foster adherence to traditional breeding objectives.

Because of the status of Lipizzans as the only breed of horse developed in Slovenia, via the Lipica Stud Farm that is now located within its borders, Lipizzans are recognized in Slovenia as a national animal. For example, a pair of Lipizzans is featured on the 20-cent Slovenian euro coins. Mounted regiments of Carabinieri police in Italy also employ the Lipizzan as one of their mounts. In October 2008, during a visit to Slovenia, a Lipizzan at Lipica, named 085 Favory Canissa XXII, was given to Queen Elizabeth II of the United Kingdom. She decided to leave the animal in the care of the stud farm.

==== Heritage of humanity list ====
On the initiative of Slovenian Ministry of Culture, the tradition of breeding and maintaining a purebred Lipizzaner is recognized by UNESCO and inscribed on the Representative List of the Intangible Cultural Heritage of Humanity as Lipizzan horse breeding traditions since 2022. Inscriptions include state parties Austria, Bosnia and Herzegovina, Croatia, Hungary, Italy, Romania, Slovakia and Slovenia.

== Training and uses ==
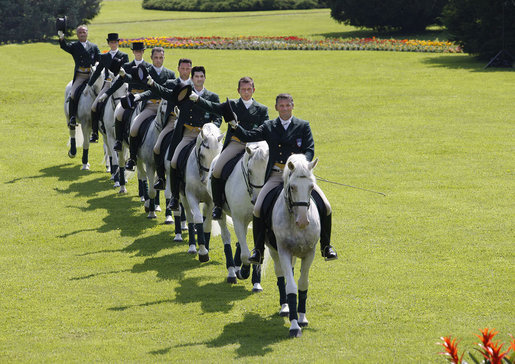
Lipizzans in Slovenia

The traditional horse training methods for Lipizzans were developed at the Spanish Riding School and are based on the principles of classical dressage, which in turn traces to the Ancient Greek writer Xenophon, whose works were rediscovered in the sixteenth century. His thoughts on development of horses' mental attitude and psyche are still considered applicable today. Other writers who strongly influenced the training methods of the Spanish Riding School include Federico Grisone, the founder of the first riding academy in Naples, who lived during the sixteenth century, and Antoine de Pluvinel and François Robichon de la Guérinière, two Frenchmen from the seventeenth and eighteenth centuries. The methods for training the Lipizzan stallions at the Spanish Riding School were passed down via an oral tradition until Field Marshal Franz Holbein and Johann Meixner, Senior Rider at the School, published the initial guidelines for the training of horse and rider at the school in 1898. In the mid-twentieth century, Alois Podhajsky wrote a number of works that serve as textbooks for many dressage riders today.

The principles taught at the Spanish Riding School are based on practices taught to cavalry riders to prepare their horses for warfare. Young stallions come to the Spanish Riding School for training when they are four years old. Full training takes an average of six years for each horse, and schooling is considered complete when they have mastered the skills required to perform the "School Quadrille". There are three progressively more difficult skill sets taught to the stallions, which are:

- Forward riding, also called straight riding or the Remontenschule, is the name given to the skills taught in the first year of training, where a young horse learns to be saddled and bridled, learns basic commands on a longe line, and then is taught to be ridden, mostly in an arena in simple straight lines and turns, to teach correct responses to the rider's legs and hands while mounted. The main goal during this time is to develop free forward movement in as natural a position as possible.
- Campaign school, Campagneschule or Campagne, is where the horse learns collection and balance through all gaits, turns, and maneuvers. The horse learns to shorten and lengthen his stride and perform lateral movements to the side, and is introduced to the more complex double bridle. This is the longest training phase and may take several years.
- High-school dressage, the haute école or Hohe Schule, includes riding the horse with greater collection with increased use of the hindquarters, developing increased regularity, skill, and finesse in all natural gaits. In this period, the horse learns the most advanced movements such as the half-pass, counter-canter, flying change, pirouette, passage, and piaffe. This is also when the horse may be taught the "airs above the ground." This level emphasizes performance with a high degree of perfection.

Although the Piber Stud trains mares for driving and under saddle, the Spanish Riding School exclusively uses stallions in its performances. Worldwide, the Lipizzan today competes in dressage and driving, as well as retaining their classic position at the Spanish Riding School.

== "Airs above the ground" ==
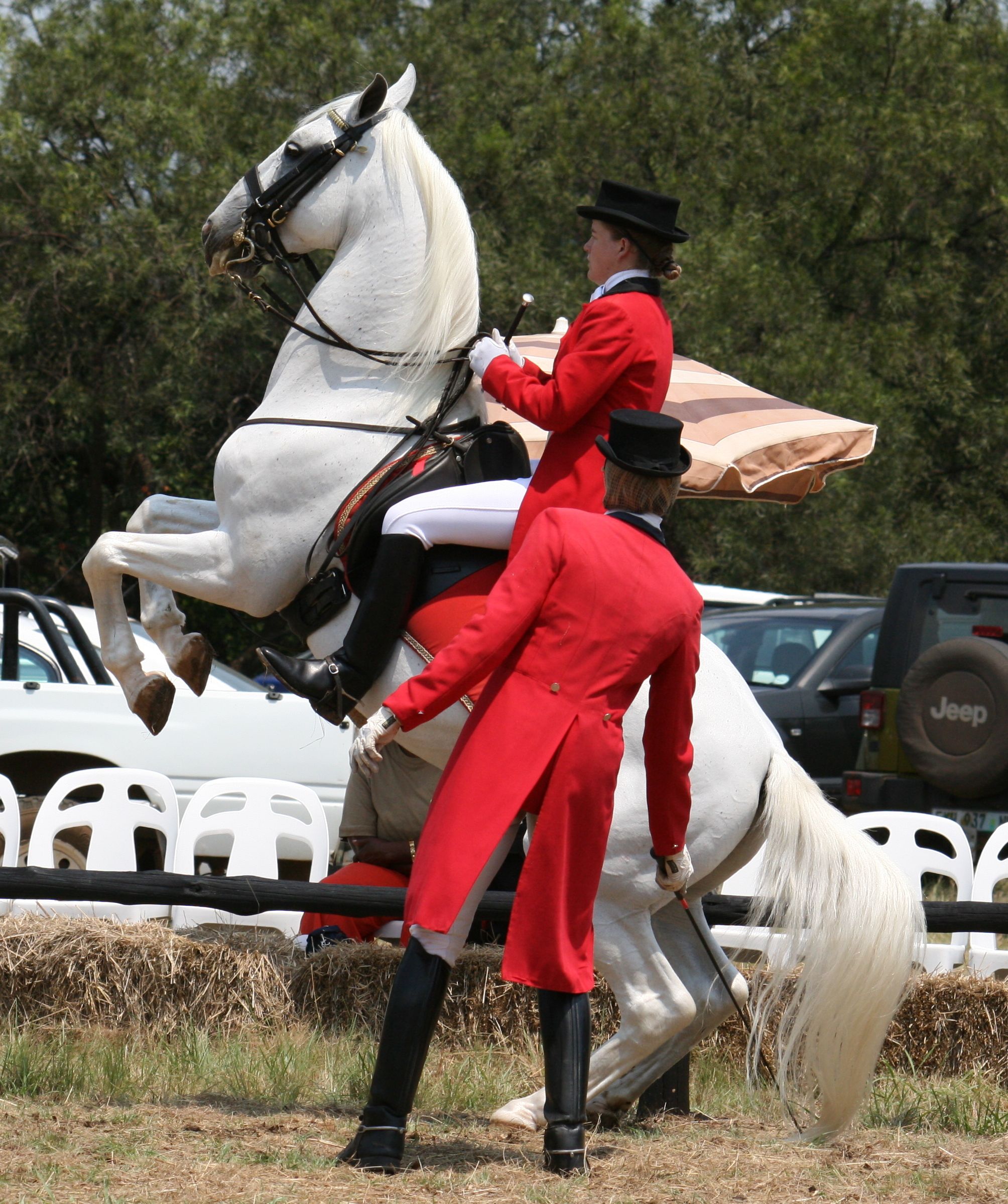
Pesade performed during an open-air performance of the South African Lipizzaners from Johannesburg

The "airs above the ground" are the difficult "high school" dressage movements made famous by the Lipizzans. The finished movements include:

- The levade is a position wherein the horse raises up both front legs, standing at a 30° angle entirely on its hind legs in a controlled form that requires a great deal of hindquarter strength. A less difficult but related movement is the pesade, where the horse rises up to a 45° angle.
- The courbette is a movement where the horse balances on its hind legs and then essentially "hops", jumping with the front legs off the ground and hind legs together.
- The capriole is a jump in place where the stallion leaps into the air, tucking his forelegs under himself, and kicks out with his hind legs at the top of the jump.

Other movements include:

- The croupade and ballotade are predecessors to the capriole. In the croupade, the horse jumps with both front and hind legs remaining tucked under the body and he does not kick out. In the ballotade, the horse jumps and untucks his hind legs slightly, he does not kick out, but the soles of the hind feet are visible if viewed from the rear.
- The mezair is a series of successive levades in which the horse lowers its forefeet to the ground before rising again on hindquarters, achieving forward motion. This movement is no longer used at the Spanish Riding School.

== In popular culture ==
Lipizzans have starred or played supporting roles in many movies, TV shows, books, and other media.

The 1940 film Florian stars two Lipizzan stallions. It was based on a 1934 novel by Felix Salten. The wife of the film's producer owned the only Lipizzans in the United States at the time the movie was made. The rescue during World War II of the Lipizzan stallions is depicted in the 1963 Walt Disney movie Miracle of the White Stallions. The movie was the only live-action, relatively realistic film set against a World War II backdrop that Disney has ever produced.

Television programs featuring the Lipizzans include The White Horses, a 1965 children's television series co-produced by RTV Ljubljana (now RTV Slovenija) of Yugoslavia and BR-TV of Germany, rebroadcast in the United Kingdom. It followed the adventures of a teenaged girl who visits a farm where Lipizzan horses are raised.
