= South African Lipizzaners =

Horse riding academy in South Africa

Coordinates: 25°58′13.4″S 28°3′17.3″E

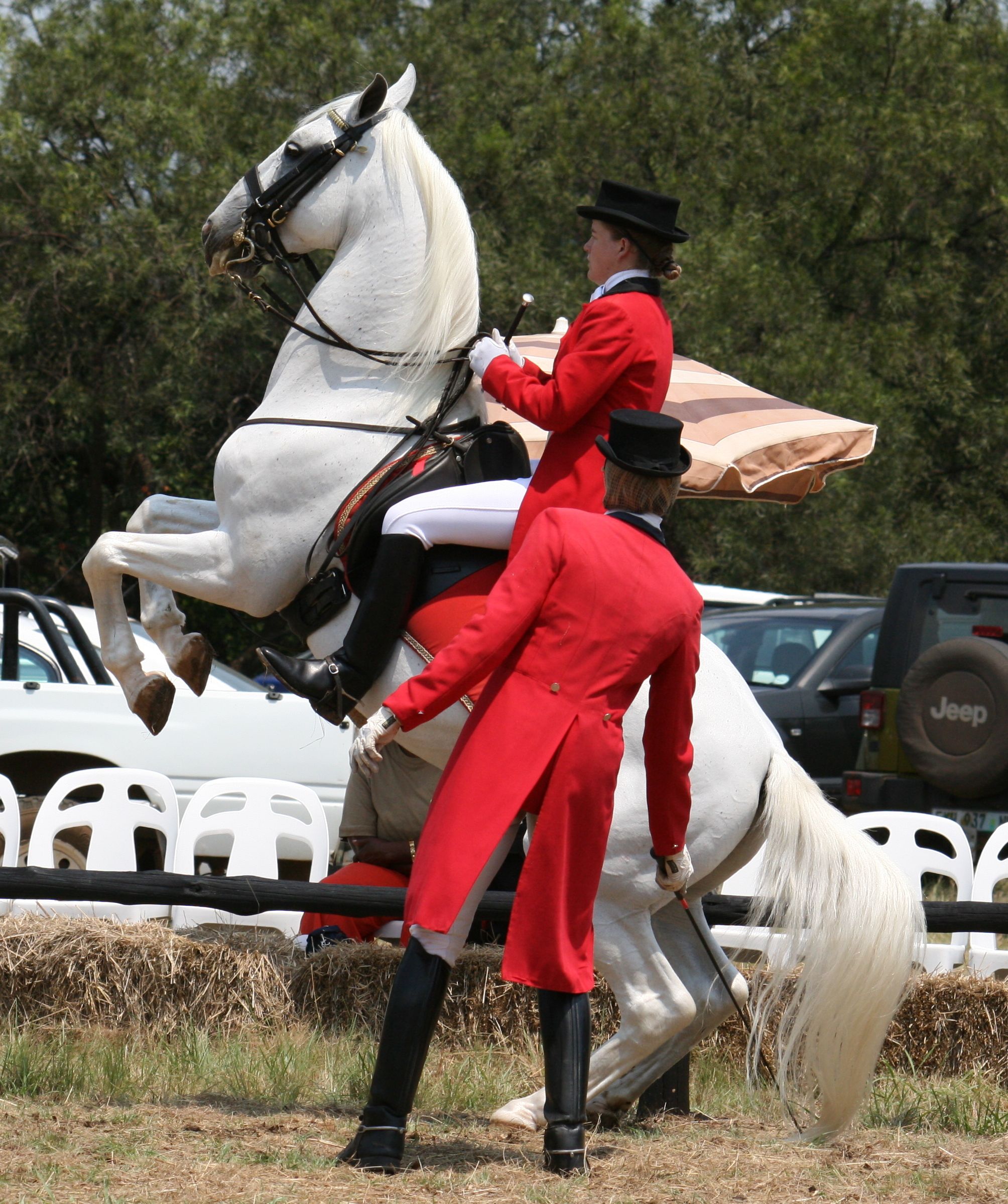
Members of the South African Lipizzaners working with a stallion performing the Pesade

The South African Lipizzaners is a riding academy that operates according to the classical model just outside of Paarl, in the Western Cape province of South Africa (previously based at Kyalami, Gauteng until 2021). In contrast to other classical riding schools, only women ride and train the 40 Lipizzan stallions. Public performances take place every week on Sundays. There is also an affiliated stud farm that provides horses for the academy as well as preserving a valuable genetic outcross pool for European studs.

The roots of the South African Lipizzaners trace to two individuals, both immigrants to South Africa who were each born in Eastern Europe: Horse breeder Count Elemér Janković-Bésán de Pribér-Vuchin of Hungary and horse trainer Major George Iwanowski of Poland.

The Jankovics-Bésán family was long known as influential breeders of Lipizzaner horses. The animals they bred included Tulipan, founder of the foundation bloodline of the same name. They also preserved an important branch of the Pluto bloodline. About 1890, the family stud farm at Terezovac (now in Croatia), a part of the Jankovics-Bésán estate, was split up because of an inheritance issue. As a result, a second stud was founded in Cabuna, not far from Terezovac. After the resolution of yet another dispute over the Slavonian property of the Jankovics-Bésáns in the late 1920s, the horse breeding operation then moved to Öreglak in Hungary. In 1944, the owner of the stud, Count Jankovics-Bésán, was forced to flee Hungary due to the advance of the Red Army. He left with eight Lipizzans: six mares and two stallions. He first went to Sünching, Germany, where his parents' stud farm was located, and then he fled with his horses to Dorset, England, arriving at Christmas 1946 at the property of Lord Digby. Then, in December, 1948, Jankovics-Bésán brought the horses to South Africa where he settled in Mooi River in KwaZulu-Natal.

== Iwanowski ==
Major George Iwanowski (born 13. March 1907, died 28. May 2008), a former Polish cavalry officer, set up the tradition of classical horsemanship in South Africa on his own. Iwanowski was born on the property of his family in Lebiodka, Poland (today Belarus). He earned a degree at the College of Agriculture in Warsaw. In his dissertation, he wrote about horse breeding. After two years as an assistant manager of the Polish National Stud in Bogusławice, he finished cavalry school and went into the army. After the Second World War he took over Gestüt Lauvenburg in Rhineland for two years. Then he went to South Africa. He and Josy Hicks founded Centaur Stables in Johannesburg. This later became the first home of the South African Lipizzaners.

== The academy and breeding program ==
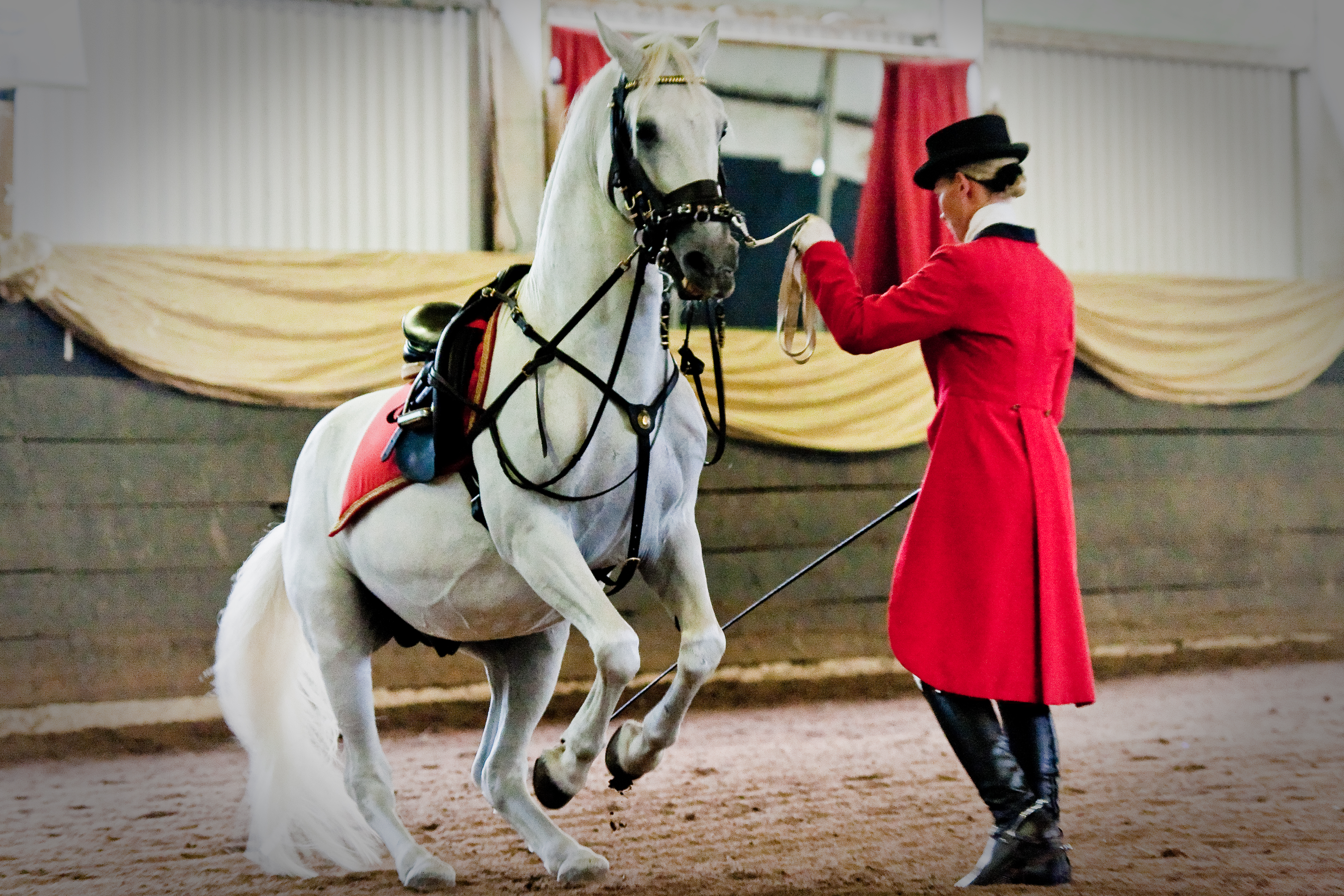
Rider Simone Howarth and Maestoso Erdem, performing the Levade

The relationship between Janković-Bésán's horses and the training talents of Iwanowski began in 1951, when the two men met at the Royal Agricultural Show in Pietermaritzburg. Janković-Bésán then invited Iwanowski to his farm in Mooi River, and offered Iwanowski the Lipizzan stallion Maestoso Erdem for training. Iwanowski trained the stallion up to the Haute ecole level.

Later Janković-Bésán had to sell his herd, which then consisted of 6 stallions, 9 mares and 3 fillies, for financial reasons. They were purchased by Jack and Angela Irvin. About 1972, the Irvins went to Vienna and imported the stallion Maestoso Palmira to add new blood to the herd in order to prevent inbreeding. They later imported another stallion to use as an outcross, Siglavy Savona. However, the Lipizzan stallions and mares in South Africa are still direct descendants of the original six mares and two stallions. The stud now has up to 20 broodmares, and has become a genetic outcross pool for European studs, because these bloodlines were cut off for several generations from the rest of the world.

Jack Irvin was also the head of the company National Chemical Products, which became the first sponsor of the South African Lipizzaners, and the company continued its sponsorship until 1978.

In the mid-1950s, George Iwanowski met Colonel Hans Handler, who at the time was second in command at the Spanish Riding School. Handler began to travel to South Africa once a year to help Iwanowski with the planning, the choreography and the training for the performance. The first public performances of the South African Lipizzaners was in 1957. There were 4 riders. Other than Iwanowski, all riders at the academy were women. Some riders of the first graduating class were Mietie of Hartesveldt, Margie Widman, Ann Sutton, Lynn Jarmen, Gill Meyer, Anne Webb, Ania Glintenkamp, Eva Sydow, Carol Kretszchmar, Maureen Quinn, Helen Dalgliesh and Valerie Welsh.

Other staff of the Spanish Riding School continued to travel to South Africa to further develop the program. Chief Rider Ignaz Lauscha's first trip to teach in South Africa was in January 1976, later on Rider Ernst Bachinger, Chief Rider Hubert Eichinger and Chief Rider Andreas Hausberger helped to train the stallions and riders.

== Bibliography ==
- George Iwanowski: You and Your Horse. Shuter & Shooter, 1987, ISBN 0-86985-971-4.
- George Iwanowski: The White Stallions of Kyalami. Purnell, Cape Town and New York 1977, ISBN 0-86843-001-3
