= Žabnik, Međimurje County =

Žabnik
- Village
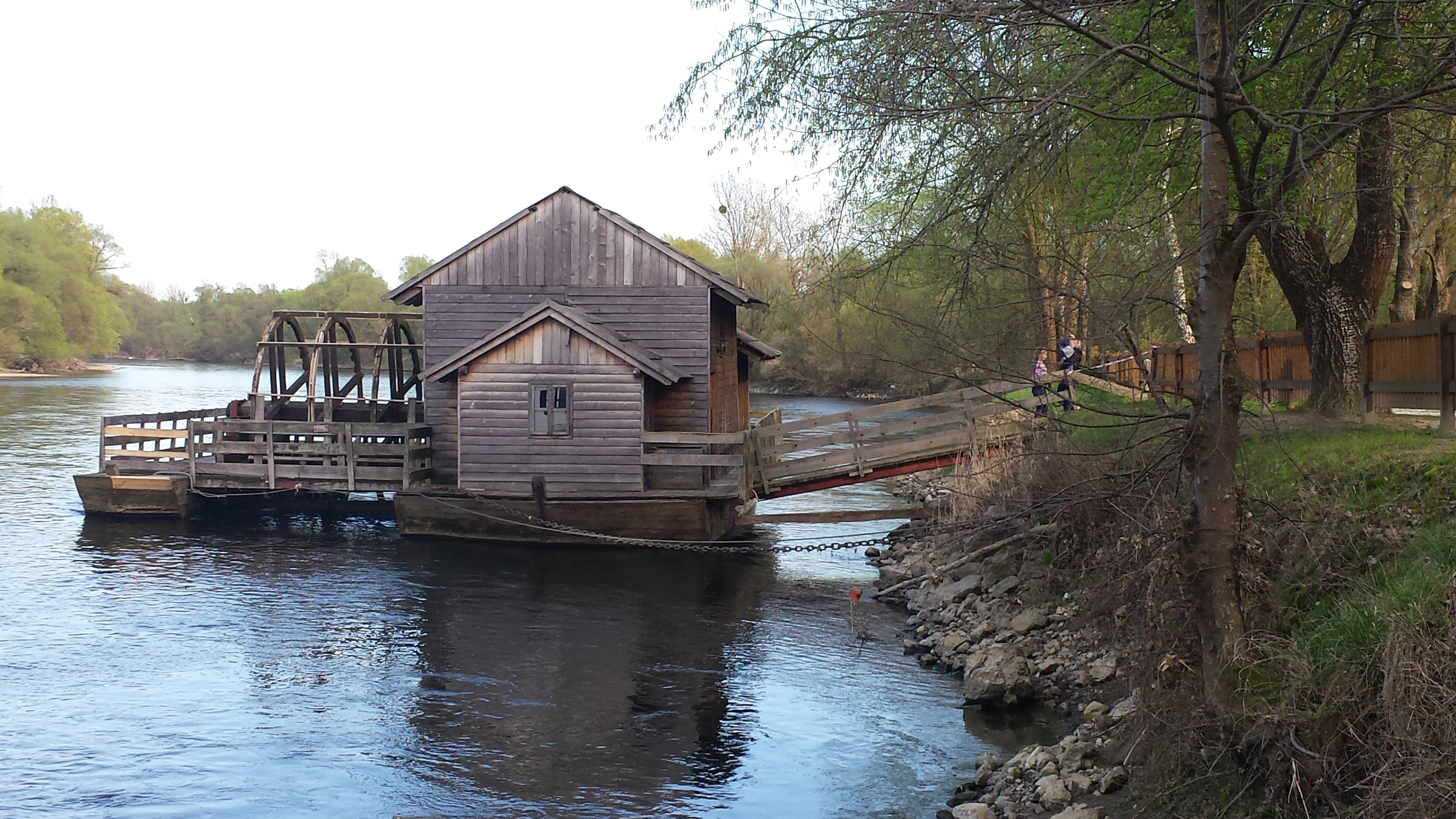
- Watermill on river Mur

- Location within Croatia
- Coordinates: 46°31′32″N 16°22′34″E
- Country: Croatia
- County: Međimurje County
- Municipality: Sveti Martin na Muri

Area
  - Total: 1.9 km^{2} (0.73 sq mi)

Population (2021)
  - Total: 365
  - Density: 190/km^{2} (500/sq mi)
- Time zone: UTC+1 (CET)
  - Summer (DST): UTC+2 (CEST)
- Postal code: 40313 Sveti Martin na Muri

Žabnik is the northernmost settlement in Croatia, located in the Sveti Martin na Muri municipality of Međimurje County.

== History ==
Žabnik is first time mentioned in charter issued in year 1478 as Sabnyk.

== Geography ==
Žabnik is located in part of Međimurje called Gornje Međimurje. Village is about 18 kilometres north from Čakovec, and some 110 kilometres north of Zagreb.

Settlement is situated in the alluvial plane of river Mur, on rivers right bank. Floodplain of River Mur is part of natural protected area called Regional park Mura-Drava.

Žabnik had a population of 372 in 2011 census.

Historical population

Year	Pop.	±%
1921	248	—
1931	269	+8.5%
1948	306	+13.8%
1953	310	+1.3%
1961	304	−1.9%

Year	Pop.	±%
1971	355	+16.8%
1981	361	+1.7%
1991	368	+1.9%
2001	377	+2.4%
2011	372	−1.3%

== Tourism ==
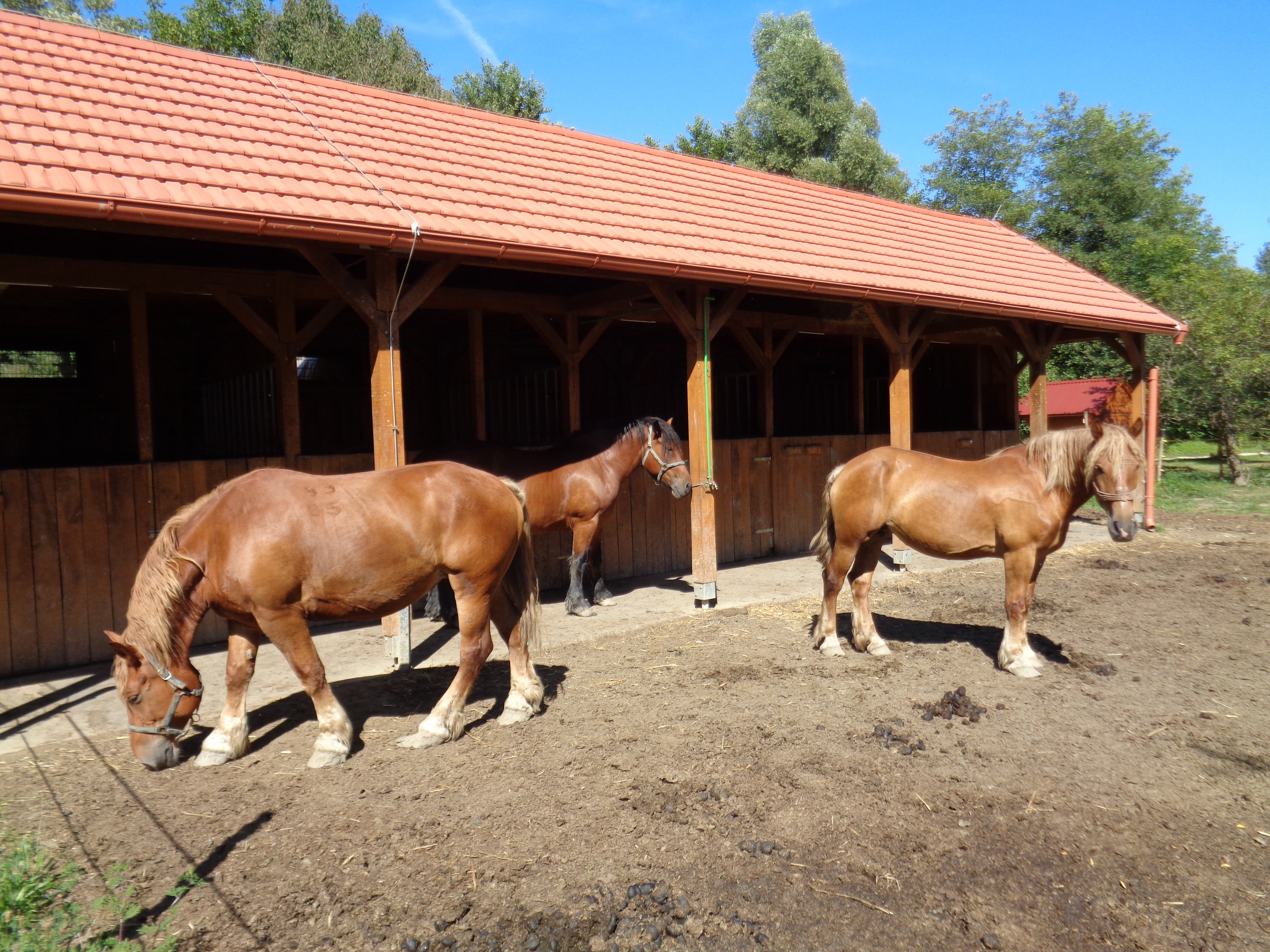
Međimurje Horse stud farm

There is a traditional mill on the river Mur. In Žabnik is also located a small horse stud of endangered autochthonous horse breed called Međimurje horse (Croatian: Međimurski konj).

An oxbow lake called Stara Mura is popular destination for anglers.
