= Kitchens of Distinction =

English alternative rock band

- L to R, Dan Goodwin, Patrick Fitzgerald, Julian Swales (1992)

Background information
- Origin: Tooting, England
- Genres: Shoegaze; dream pop; alternative rock; neo-psychedelia; post-punk
- Years active: 1986–1996, 2012–present
- Labels: One Little Indian, A&M, Fierce Panda, 3 Loop Music
- Members: Patrick Fitzgerald; Julian Swales; Dan Goodwin
- Website: Facebook page

Kitchens of Distinction (sometimes shortened colloquially to KoD) are an English rock band formed in Tooting, South London in 1986. The trio consist of lead singer and bassist Patrick Fitzgerald, guitarist Julian Swales and drummer Daniel Goodwin.

The band were retrospectively considered part of the shoegaze subgenre and released four studio albums before disbanding in 1996. In September 2012, Patrick Fitzgerald announced Kitchens of Distinction's reunion, followed by the 2013 release of their fifth album, their first in 19 years.

Kitchens of Distinction did not attain the commercial success or widespread recognition of their other shoegaze contemporaries, as Fitzgerald was openly gay and touched upon the topic often in his lyrics. Much press coverage pigeonholed the band's image as a result of his sexuality even as Fitzgerald expressed his distaste for Kitchens of Distinction being labelled a "gay band".

== History ==
=== Beginnings to break-up (1986–1996) ===
Dan Goodwin (drums) met Julian Swales (guitar) at college in 1980, and Swales met Patrick Fitzgerald (vocals/bass guitar) at a party in 1985. The trio began rehearsing together that same year, taking their name from a company of the same name that specialised in home decor and kitchen and plumbing fixtures, after Swales spotted one of their advertisements on the side of a bus while riding his bike. The Kitchens' first single, "The Last Gasp Death Shuffle" (which featured Swales on lead vocals and bass, as well as guitar) (Note: Fitzgerald states in the liner notes for Capsule: The Best of KOD 1988–94 (pg. 4, in the notes for "Prize") that he was unable to learn the bassline soon enough to record the song, and Swales sang it instead) was recorded in just one day on an eight-track in a Kennington basement, and was released in December 1987 on the band's own Gold Rush Records. It was named a 'Single of the Week' in NME, and led to the band signing with British indie label One Little Indian Records (OLI); around this time, Fitzgerald – a medical doctor – put his career on hold to devote himself fully to the band. Their first singles for OLI, 1988's "Prize" and 1989's "The 3rd Time We Opened the Capsule", made it onto the "NME Writers' 100 Best Indie Singles Ever" list, published on 25 July 1992.

Their first full-length album, Love Is Hell, was released in April 1989. Fitzgerald's impassioned, wordy, often bluntly personal vocals careened over what sounded like a mass of swirling guitars, though the band only had one guitarist. Swales' chiming, effects-laden style of playing drew him comparisons to the guitarists of the Chameleons, Cocteau Twins, and A.R. Kane. KOD's melodic yet abstract sound was a precursor of the shoegaze scene of the late 1980s/early 1990s.

Despite the promising start, the band faced a subdued reception from the mainstream music industry, generally due to their lyrical content. For instance, "Margaret's Injection", on the 1989 Elephantine EP, was a fantasy about killing then-Prime Minister Margaret Thatcher. Fitzgerald was openly gay, having come out in 1984, and his lyrics were unapologetic, especially on tracks like "Prize" and "Within the Daze of Passion". A&M Records allowed Fitzgerald to express himself in his lyrics, never asking him to change his lyrics or closet himself in interviews. Fitzgerald said he was "more interested in presenting gay lifestyle as a positive thing" rather than writing self-pitying and angry lyrics.

Even the more indie-focused television programs like Snub TV and Rapido failed to give them much coverage, although Snub TV played the video for the title track of their 1991 EP Drive that Fast. Likewise, they were not at first offered a John Peel radio session; they eventually did get one after asking Peel personally, following a Glastonbury performance that he appreciated.

Kitchens of Distinction sometimes performed "secret" gigs under the alter ego Toilets of Destruction. An example was at the Bull & Gate in Kentish Town on 6 August 1990, where the band appeared in drag and played ABBA, David Bowie, and Bauhaus covers.

The group signed with A&M Records in the US in 1990, and went into the studio with producer Hugh Jones. Their second album Strange Free World was released in February 1991, and spawned some moderately successful A-sides in "Drive that Fast" and "Quick as Rainbows", both of which were very well received by college radio in the US. The band went back into the studio in 1992, again with Jones at the helm, and their third album The Death of Cool came out in August that year; it was named in honour of the passing of Miles Davis, who had recently died, and whose influential album titled The Birth of the Cool had been released in 1950. A&M balked at the band's choice of "Breathing Fear" for the first single, due to its touchy subject matter (gay bashing), so "Smiling" became the album's initial single in the US. The band toured extensively, including a high-profile slot opening for their US label-mate Suzanne Vega. In retrospect, Swales said that the tour was a "complete waste of time and a disaster from start to finish" because of the mismatch between Vega's soft rock stylings and Kitchens of Distinction's loudness.

Later in 1993, KOD began work on their fourth album, co-producing it themselves with engineer Pete Bartlett. OLI rejected the album twice, and eventually, both label and band agreed to bring in up-and-coming producer Pascal Gabriel to work on a couple of tracks. One of the label's complaints about the album as the band originally submitted it was that it seemed to lack a potential hit single, so Gabriel produced a new song ("Come on Now") that the band had written after the rest of the album had already been recorded; Gabriel also remixed two of the album's other tracks (opening song "Sand on Fire" and first single "Now It's Time to Say Goodbye"). The resulting album, Cowboys and Aliens, was released in the UK in October 1994; although the band admitted that they enjoyed working with Gabriel, the changes did nothing to help the album's dismal sales. When the album saw its US release in early 1995, it was largely ignored by the same alternative rock radio and media that had championed them just a few years earlier. By the end of that year, both A&M and OLI had dropped the band.

Shortening their name to Kitchens O.D. and signing to the London-based indie label Fierce Panda Records, they issued a single, "Feel My Genie" in May 1996, which was named 'Single of the Week' by Melody Maker, but the group officially disbanded that summer after a farewell gig at Kings Cross in London.

=== From dissolution to reunion (1996–present) ===
Fitzgerald continued to record and release music under the name Fruit (not to be confused with the Australian band of the same name), a project that also featured guest vocals from Miki Berenyi of Lush and Isabel Monteiro of Drugstore. He also formed Lost Girls, a project with 4AD recording artist Heidi Berry; one single titled "Needle's Eye" was released, eventually followed by a full album in 2014.

Since 2000, he has been recording as Stephen Hero, and has put out several releases under that name. The latest is Apparition in the Woods, released in November 2009.

In September 2012, Fitzgerald announced that he and Swales had recorded and were in the process of editing ten new songs. The reunited trio of Fitzgerald, Swales, and Goodwin released their fifth studio album Folly, their first new album in 19 years, on 30 September 2013.

Lost Girls' album was released in October 2014 by 3 Loop Music on vinyl, download and as a 2CD expanded edition (featuring demos and extra tracks).

== Members ==
- Patrick Fitzgerald (born 7 April 1964, Basel, Switzerland) – vocals, bass guitar
- Julian Swales (born 23 March 1962, Cwmbran, Wales) – guitar, vocals (occasionally)
- Daniel Goodwin (born 22 July 1962, London, England) – drums, percussion

== Discography ==
=== Albums ===
Year	Album details	Peak chart positions
Year	Album details	UK
1989	Love Is Hell: Released: April 1989; Label: One Little Indian (TPLP9); Formats: CD, LP, Cassette	—
1991	Strange Free World: Released: 18 March 1991; Label: One Little Indian (TPLP19); Formats: CD, LP, Cassette	45
1992	The Death of Cool: Released: 3 August 1992; Label: One Little Indian (TPLP39); Formats: CD, LP, Cassette	72
1994	Cowboys and Aliens: Released: 3 October 1994; Label: One Little Indian (TPLP53); Formats: CD, LP	—
2013	Folly: Released: 30 September 2013; Label: 3 Loop Music; Formats: CD, LP	—
"—" denotes a release that did not chart.

=== Compilations ===
Year	Album details	Peak chart positions
Year	Album details	UK
2003	Capsule: The Best of KOD 1988–94: Released: 21 April 2003; Label: One Little Indian (TPLP613); Formats: 2 CDs	—
2017	Watch Our Planet Circle: Released: 3 March 2017; Label: One Little Indian (TPLP1394BOX); Formats: 6 CDs	—
"—" denotes a release that did not chart.

=== Singles and EPs ===
Song	Release date	Release info	Formats	UK Singles Chart	US Alt	Album
"The Last Gasp Death Shuffle"/"Escape"	December 1987	Gold Rush (GRR3)	7"	—	—	Non-album single
"Prize"	October 1988	One Little Indian (12TP)	12"	—	—	Love Is Hell
"The 3rd Time We Opened the Capsule"	May 1989	One Little Indian (19TP)	12"	—	—	Love Is Hell
Elephantine EP	October 1989	One Little Indian (29TP)	CD, 12"	—	—	Non-album single
"Quick as Rainbows"	March 1990	One Little Indian (43TP)	CD, 12"	—	18	Strange Free World
"Gorgeous Love" (Note: Promotional-only releases)	December 1990	A&M	Promo CD, promo 12"	—	—	Strange Free World
Drive that Fast EP	January 1991	One Little Indian (49TP)	CD, 7", 12"	93	12	Strange Free World
"Breathing Fear"	May 1992	One Little Indian (59TP)	CD, 7", 12"	—	—	The Death of Cool
"When in Heaven"	August 1992	One Little Indian (69TP)	CD, 12"	—	—	The Death of Cool
"Smiling"	September 1992	A&M	Promo 12"	—	15	The Death of Cool
"4 Men"	October 1992	A&M	Promo CD	—	28	The Death of Cool
"Now It's Time to Say Goodbye"	September 1994	One Little Indian (111TP)	CD, 12"	86	—	Cowboys and Aliens
"Cowboys and Aliens"	January 1995	A&M	Promo CD	—	—	Cowboys and Aliens
"Feel My Genie"/"To Love a Star" (Note: "Feel My Genie"/"To Love a Star" was released under the name Kitchens O.D.)	May 1996	Fierce Panda (NING 19)	CD, 7"	—	—	Non-album single
"Japan to Jupiter"	September 2013	3 Loop Music	Promo CD	—	—	Folly
"Extravagance"	April 2014	3 Loop Music	10"	—	—	Folly
"—" denotes a release that did not chart.

=== Non-album tracks ===
- "Pastor Niemöller's Lament (Never Again)" – found on The Disagreement of the People, a compilation album of artists against the Criminal Justice and Public Order Act 1994 (November 1995, Cooking Vinyl)

=== Cover songs ===
- "White Horses" (1994; B-side to the UK single "Now It's Time to Say Goodbye" and the US single "Cowboys and Aliens") – A cover of the theme song from the 1960s television series The White Horses (originally performed by Jackie Lee; a UK top 10 hit during April 1968). Featuring a rare lead vocal by Swales, it was first included on a free cassette given away with a UK music paper before being issued as a B-side.
