= Međimurje Horse Stud, Žabnik =

Horse stud farm in Croatia

Coordinates: 46.5263°N 16.3780°E

Međimurje Horse Stud Žabnik
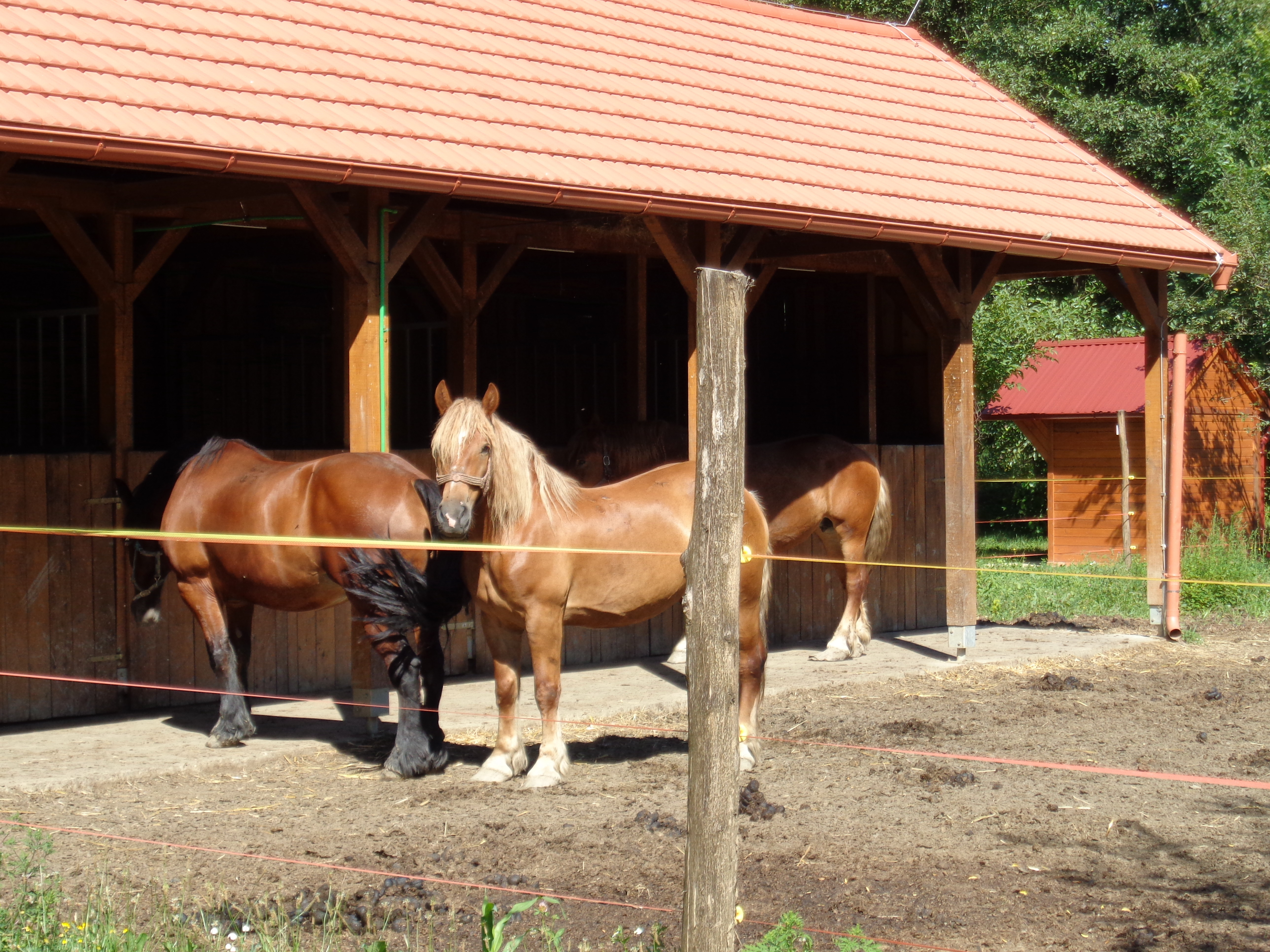
- view of the mares in front of the stable
- Country: Croatia
- County: Međimurje County
- Acreage: 20
- Established: 2015
- Founder: „Međimurje Nature“
- Website: medjimurska-priroda.info/tag/ergela/

Međimurje Horse Stud (Croatian: Ergela međimurskog konja) is a small stud farm comprising 20 acres in the northern part of Međimurje County, Croatia. It is located at the Žabnik village in the Sveti Martin na Muri municipality.

Established in 2015, Međimurje Horse Stud is opened to help preserve and revitalize Međimurje horse, a Croatian medium-heavy horse breed of draught horse which is endangered today, with a remaining small population in its original area in Croatia, and a larger one on the north side of the Mur river in southwestern Hungary, as well as in eastern Slovenia.

The Stud is situated in a local municipality pasture (called gmajna), i. e. common land, close to marshes at Mura River. There is a newly built stable on the farm, with other facilities necessary for horses (well, food depot etc.). The farm establishing was financially supported by the IPA funding mechanism of the European Union, within the transnational cooperation.

The establisher and owner of the Stud is „Međimurska priroda“ („Međimurje Nature“), a public institution in charge of environmental protection, control, development and promotion. After finishing the establishing and building activities, it redeemed eight mares from private horse breeders to create an initial breeding fund of animals.

The Stud opening ceremony took place on 30 November 2015. Because of upcoming winter, it was open for public only next spring—on Sunday, 1 May 2016—and included in tourist routes, in Međimurje County.

== Gallery ==
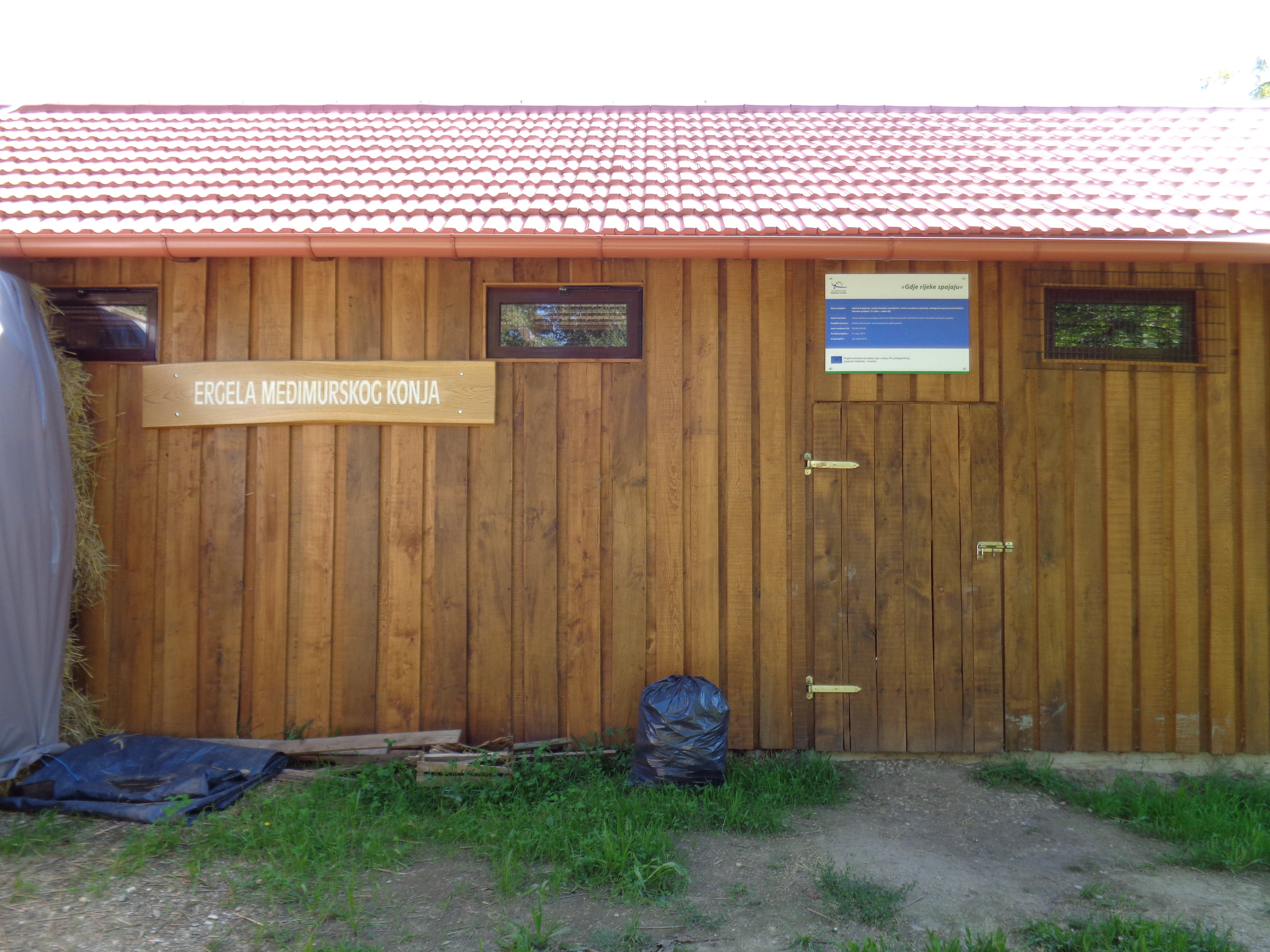
Stable

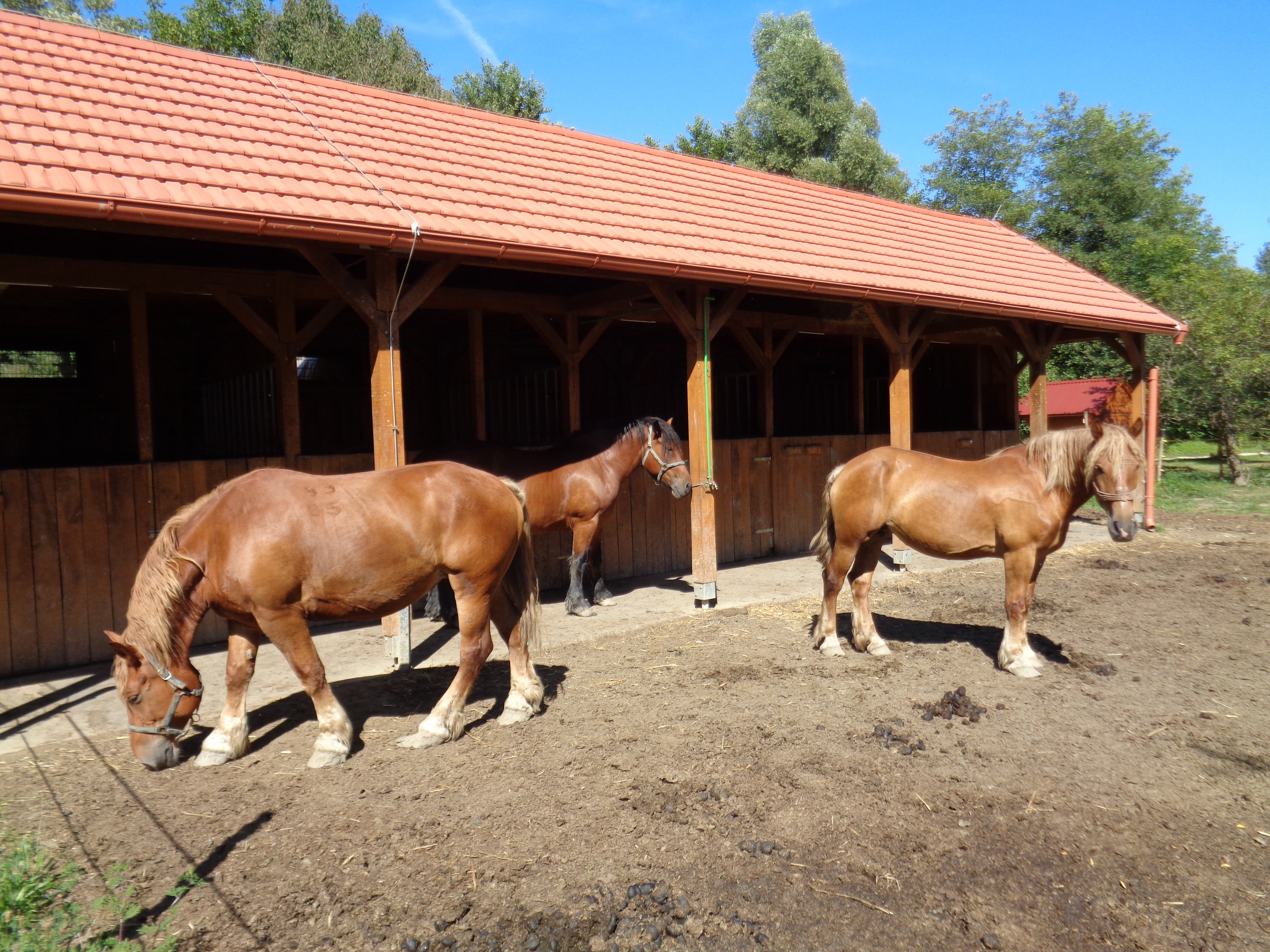
Mares

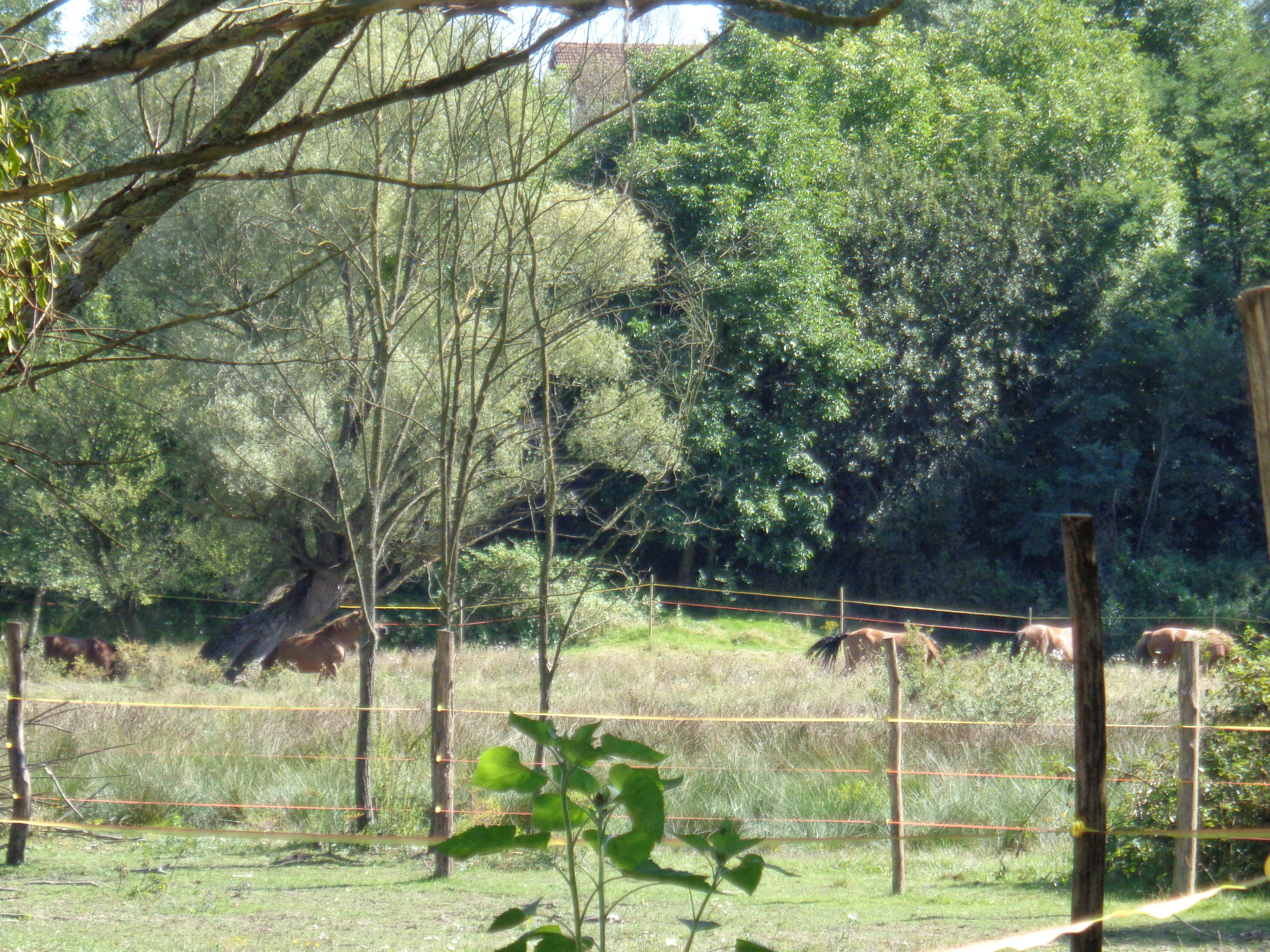
Pasture

== See also ==
- CUJZEK Stud
- Alkars' Stud
- Đakovo Stud
- Lipik Stud
