= Strange Free World =

Studio album by Kitchens of Distinction
- Released: 18 March 1991
- Recorded: 1990
- Studio: Chipping Norton Recording Studios, Oxfordshire
- Genre: Shoegaze, dream pop
- Length: 43:28
- Label: One Little Indian
- Producer: Hugh Jones

Kitchens of Distinction chronology
| Love Is Hell (1989) | Strange Free World (1991) | The Death of Cool (1992) |

Singles from Strange Free World
- 1. "Quick as Rainbows" Released: March 1990; 2. "Drive That Fast" Released: January 1991

Professional ratings
Review scores
| Source | Rating |
|---|---|
| AllMusic | 4/5 stars |
| Entertainment Weekly | B |
| NME | 9/10 |
| Record Mirror | 8/10 |
| Select | 4/5 |

Strange Free World is the second album by British alternative rock band Kitchens of Distinction, released on 19 February 1991 in the US by A&M Records and on 18 March 1991 in the UK by One Little Indian Records. It is the follow-up to their 1989 debut Love Is Hell. Noted producer Hugh Jones, who worked with Echo & the Bunnymen (on their 1981 album Heaven Up Here), among many others, helped KOD to sound more at ease in the studio.

Reviewer Ned Raggett of AllMusic notes that "Musically, the tunes sound quite ambitious in many ways, often steering away from conventional verse-chorus-verse formulas," and calling the album an overall excellent effort. It is often considered one of the group's best works, as well as possibly its most popular and commercially successful, peaking at number 45 on the UK Albums Chart. The album also includes their first UK charting single "Drive That Fast," which peaked at number 93 on the UK Singles Chart. In 2016, Pitchfork ranked the album at #18 in its 50 Best Shoegaze Albums of All Time, noting the band's status as an outlier in the shoegaze genre.

== Track listing ==
All tracks are written by Kitchens of Distinction.

| No. | Title | Length |
|---|---|---|
| 1. | "Railwayed" | 4:57 |
| 2. | "Quick as Rainbows" | 3:48 |
| 3. | "Hypnogogic" | 4:01 |
| 4. | "He Holds Her, He Needs Her" | 3:48 |
| 5. | "Polaroids" | 4:51 |
| 6. | "Gorgeous Love" | 4:21 |
| 7. | "Aspray" | 3:37 |
| 8. | "Drive That Fast" | 5:36 |
| 9. | "Within the Daze of Passion" | 3:57 |
| 10. | "Under the Sky, Inside the Sea" | 4:32 |

== Singles ==
- "Quick as Rainbows" (March 1990)
  - UK single:
  1. "Quick as Rainbows"
  2. "Mainly Mornings" (Live)
  3. "In a Cave" (Live)
  4. "Shiver" (Live)
  - US promo 12" single:
  1. "Quick as Rainbows"
  2. "These Drinkers"
  3. "Elephantiny" [acoustic version of "Elephantine"]
  4. "Three to Beam Up"
- "Drive That Fast" (January 1991)
  - UK single:
  1. "Drive That Fast" (7" Edit)
  2. "These Drinkers"
  3. "Elephantiny"
  4. "Three to Beam Up"
  - US promo 12" single:
  1. "Drive That Fast"
  2. "Railwayed"

== Personnel ==
Kitchens of Distinction

- Patrick Fitzgerald – vocals, bass
- Julian Swales – guitar
- Dan Goodwin – drums

with:

- Roddy Lorimer – trumpet on "Under the Sky, Inside the Sea"

Technical

- Hugh Jones – producer, engineer
- Michael Ade – assistant engineer
- Helen Woodward – mixing engineer
- Richard Norris – assistant mixing engineer
- Ken Perry – mastering
- Colin Bell – photography
- Art direction and design by Two Guys and Kitchens of Distinction
- Mixed at Master Rock
- Mastered at A&M Mastering
