= Lipik Stud =

Croatian Lipizzan horse national breeding stud farm

Coordinates: 45.415642°N 17.140993°E

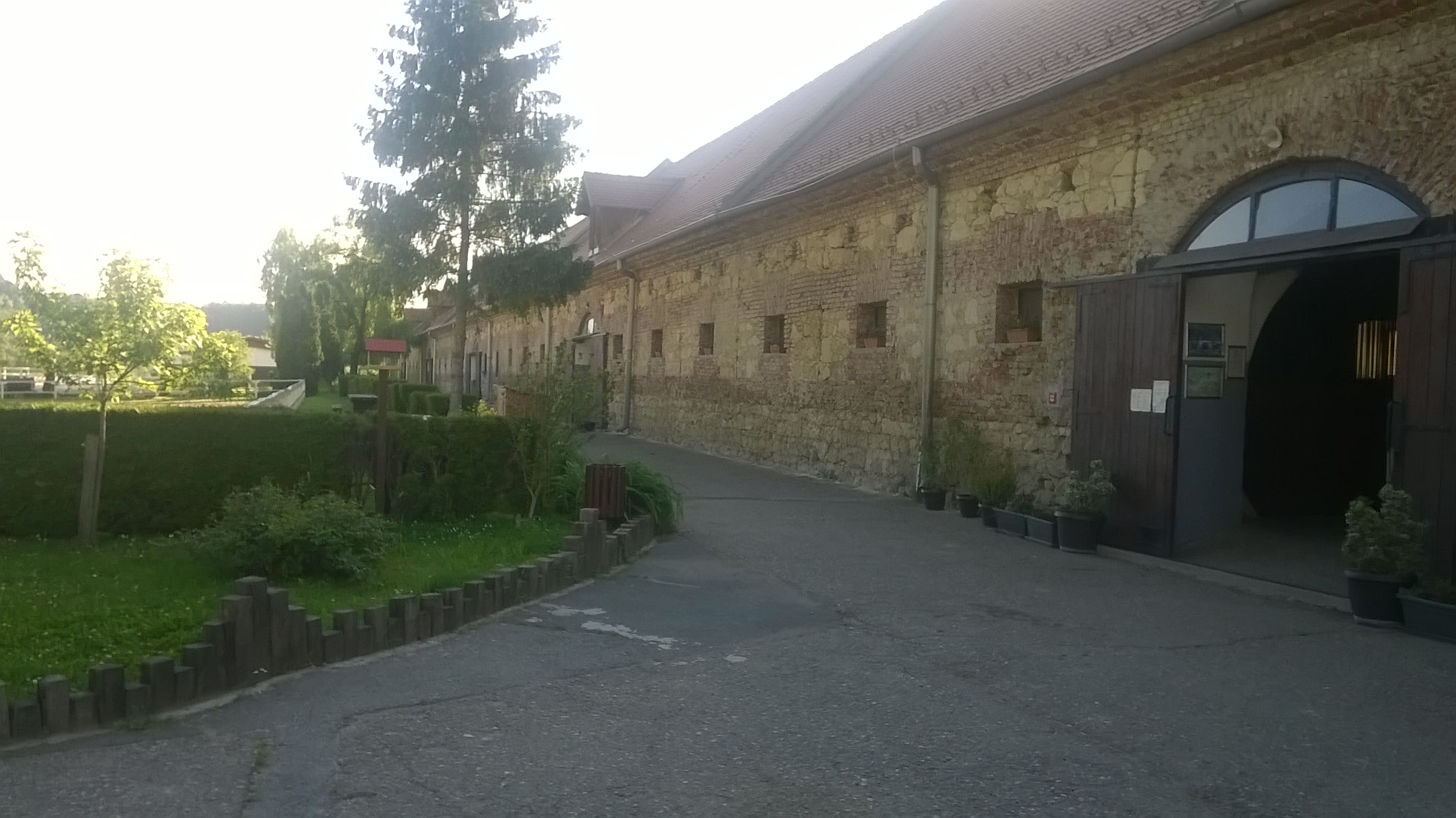
- Lipik Stud exterior
- Country: Croatia
- County: Požega-Slavonia County
- Acreage: 106 (43 hectares)
- Established: 1843
- Founder: Count Izidor Janković
- Website: ergela-lipik.org/hr/novosti/

The Lipik Stud (Croatian: Ergela Lipik) is a Croatian Lipizzan horse national breeding stud farm located in Lipik, Požega-Slavonia County. The Stud originated in 1843 as count Izidor Janković built large stables on his estate. Today it comprises approximately 106 acres in the western part of the Town of Lipik, with a total of 74 horses, 70 of which are Lipizzans.

== History ==
Founded in 1843 by Count Izidor Janković, Lipik Stud had around twenty horses at the beginning. In 1906 a new owner, Stjepan Layer from Virovitica, possessed twenty Lipizzan, Nonius and Anglo-Arabian mares and three stallions. In 1936 the Stud was enlarged with approximately new 60 horses, whereas in 1954 this number increased to approximately 250. The horse breeding was suddenly interrupted in the late 1960s by the local authorities and it was only in the early 1980s that it began to recover. During the Croatian Homeland War the Stud ceased to exist. More than 100 horses, most of them Lipizzans, were taken by the Serbian Army forces to the occupied territory and Serbia, or slaughtered. After the war, the Stud facilities were renovated and the survived horses were returned from Serbia. In 2008 the Lipik Stud became the State Stud again and in 2010 it was merged with the Đakovo Stud.

== Foundation stallions and mares ==
There are five male breeding lines in the Lipik Stud today: Conversano (from 1767), Favory (1779), Neapolitano (1770), Siglavy (1810) and Pluto (1765). From Favory originates Favory Mara LII-3, the present-day Lipik Stud breeding stallion, foaled in 2004. The mare lines bred in Lipik are: Batosta, Capriola, Allegra, Trompeta, Gaeta, Gaetana, Bonadea, Monteaura, Wera, Krabbe, Drava, Kitty, Cica and Liza.

== Description ==
The Stud includes four stables, dressage grounds, a collection of fiacres carriages, and auxiliary buildings (containing barn warehouse, equipment and accessories for employees, souvenir shop etc.). One of the stables is used for keeping the breeding stallions, the other for mares with new-born foals, the third for yearlings, colts and fillies, and the last one for the equipment for sports competition.

Breeding and selecting, the complete work and care about horses in the Stud is under continued surveillance of experts. Their objective is to initiate advances in selection and to preserve the genetic potential of the horses, especially of the Lipizzan breed in Croatia. A particular attention and accent is given to their appearances, movements and behaviour. The Stud organizes various educational programs and workshops and is included in tourist routes in Požega-Slavonia County.

== Gallery ==
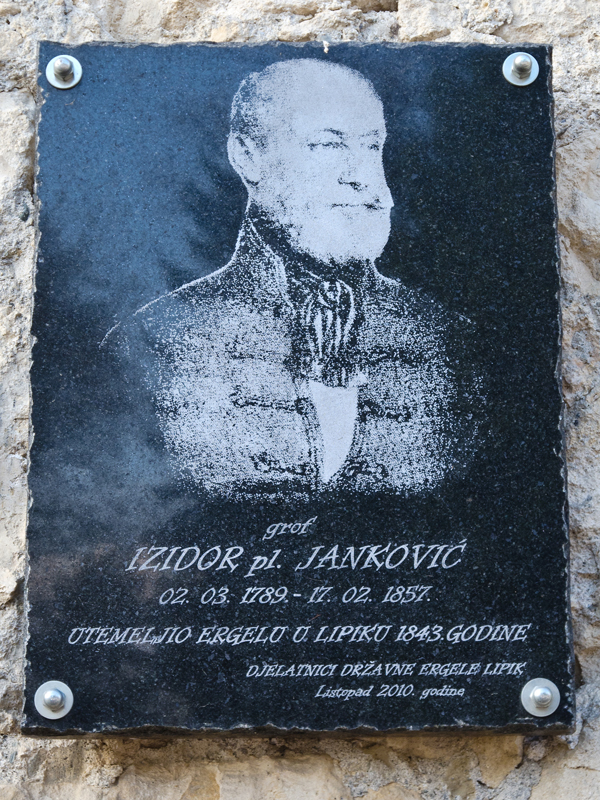
Count Izidor Janković, founder of the Lipik Stud

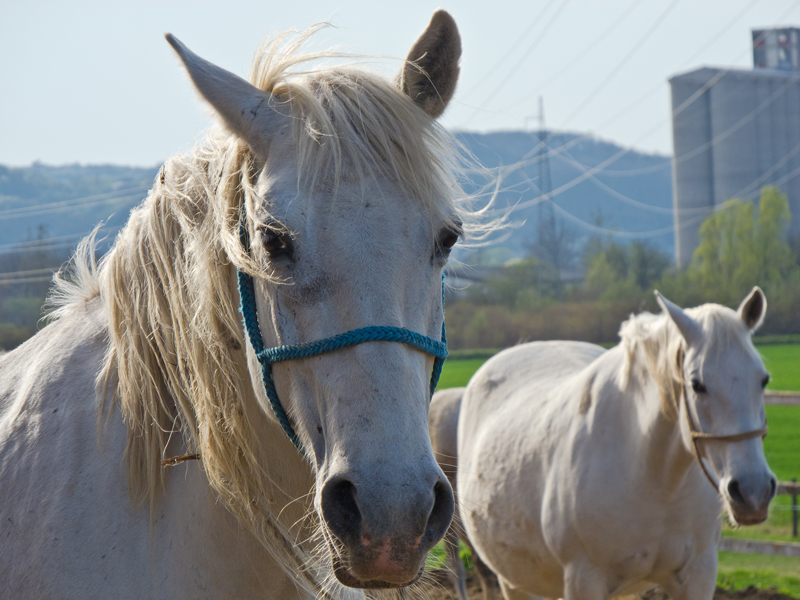
Lipizzans of the Lipik Stud

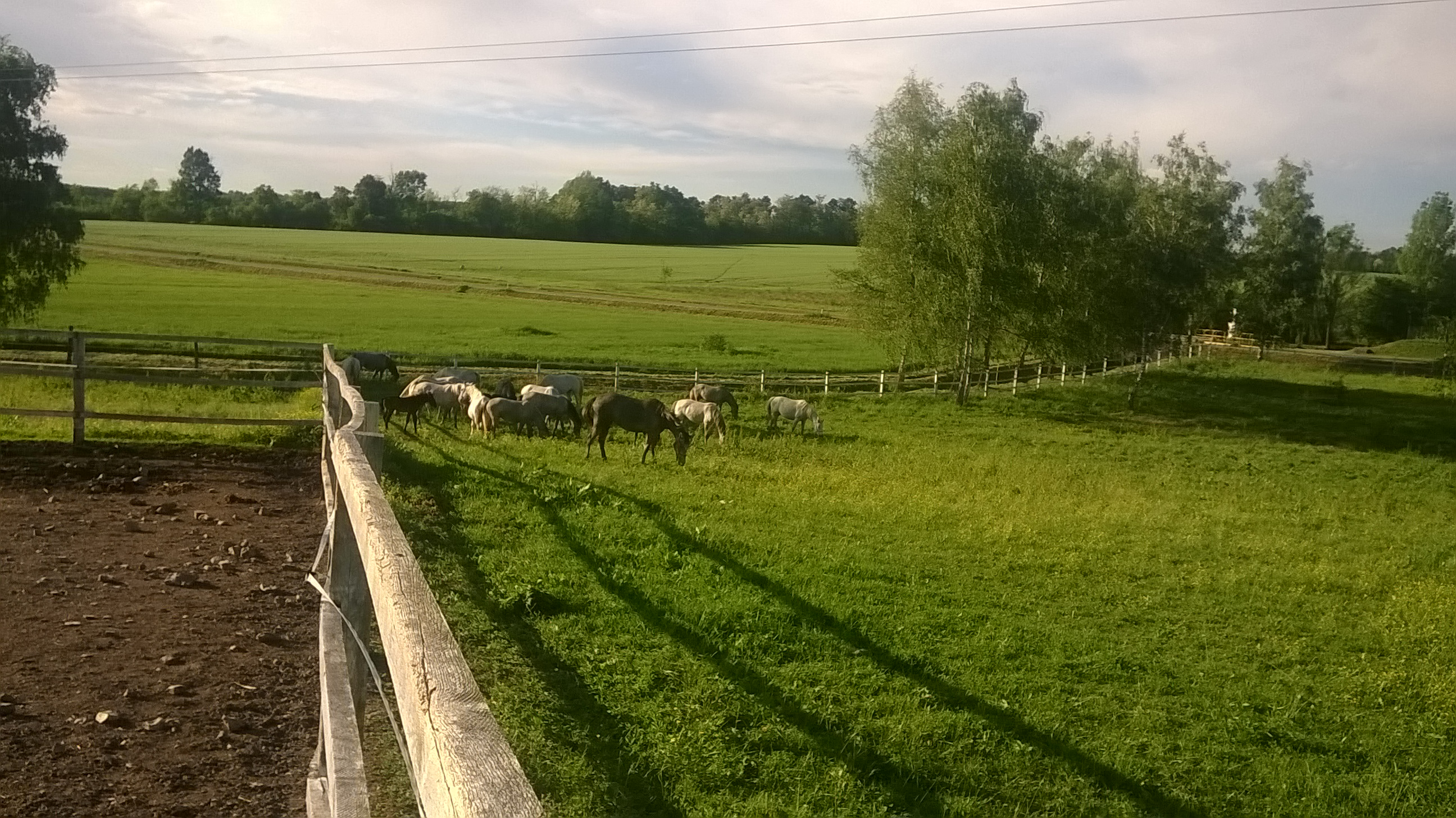
Horses on the vast land

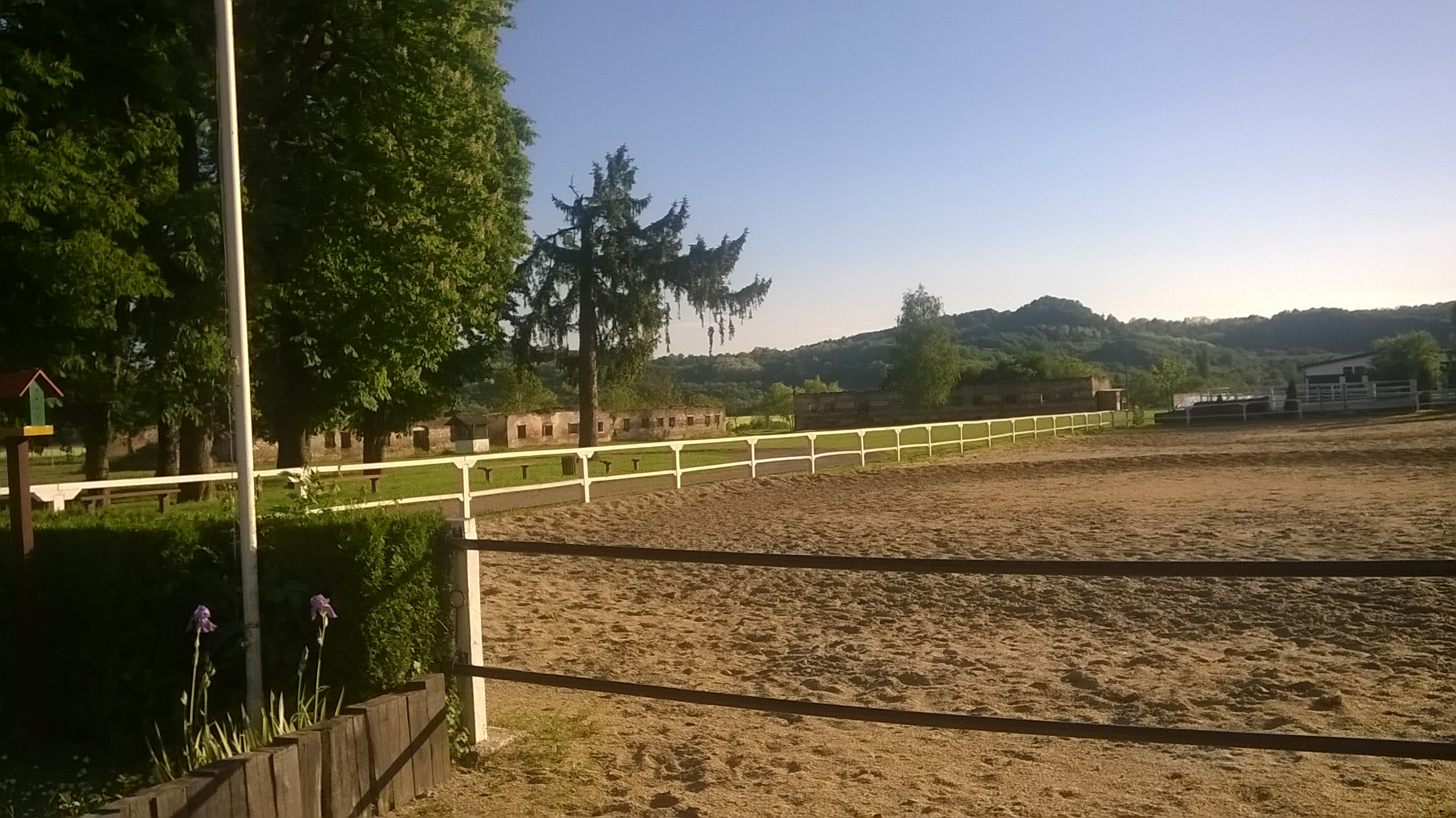
Lipik Stud training ground

== See also ==
- Alkars' Stud
- Đakovo Stud
- Međimurje Horse Stud, Žabnik
- CUJZEK Stud
