= Love Is Hell (Kitchens of Distinction album) =

Studio album by Kitchens of Distinction
- Released: April 1989
- Recorded: 1988
- Studio: Berry Street Studio, Clerkenwell, London
- Genre: Shoegaze, dream pop
- Length: 39:12
- Label: One Little Indian
- Producer: Kitchens of Distinction

Kitchens of Distinction chronology
Love Is Hell (1989)	Strange Free World (1991)

Singles from Love Is Hell
- 1. "Prize" Released: October 1988; 2. "The 3rd Time We Opened the Capsule" Released: May 1989

Professional ratings
Review scores
Source	Rating
AllMusic	4.5/5 stars
NME	8/10
Q	4/5 stars
Rolling Stone	3.5/5 stars

Love Is Hell is the debut album by British alternative rock band Kitchens of Distinction. It was released in April 1989 by One Little Indian Records in the UK and A&M Records in the US. While the album earned KOD comparisons to bands like Echo & the Bunnymen and the Chameleons, the guitar soundscapes created by Julian Swales and the passionate lyrics and vocal delivery from Patrick Fitzgerald gave Kitchens of Distinction their own signature sound. The album also maintains a punkier sound than to be featured on the band's later albums. The 1993 CD edition of the album includes the band's 1989 Elephantine EP as 4 bonus tracks.

The album takes its title from the last line in "Hammer", a song about love gone wrong.

== Track listing ==
All tracks are written by Kitchens of Distinction; all lyrics by Patrick Fitzgerald

No.	Title	Length
1.	"In a Cave"	4:34
2.	"Time to Groan"	3:56
3.	"Shiver"	5:19
4.	"Prize"	5:26
5.	"The 3rd Time We Opened the Capsule"	3:19
6.	"Her Last Day in Bed"	4:32
7.	"Courage, Mother"	2:50
8.	"Mainly Mornings"	3:14
9.	"Hammer"	6:02

1993 edition bonus tracks
No.	Title	Length
10.	"Elephantine"	3:20
11.	"Margaret's Injection"	4:33
12.	"The 1001st Fault"	4:07
13.	"Anvil Dub"	5:17

== Singles ==
- "Prize" (October 1988)
  1. "Prize"
  2. "Concede"
  3. "Innocent"
- "The 3rd Time We Opened the Capsule" (May 1989)
  1. "The 3rd Time We Opened the Capsule"
  2. "4 Men" (early version)
  3. "Into the Sea"
  4. "Prize" (Demo)
- "Elephantine" EP (October 1989)
  1. "Elephantine"
  2. "Margaret's Injection"
  3. "The 1001st Fault"
  4. "Anvil Dub"

== Personnel ==
Kitchens of Distinction

- Patrick Fitzgerald – vocals, bass
- Julian Swales – guitar
- Dan Goodwin – drums

with:

- Anna Palm – violin on "Her Last Day in Bed"

Technical

- Barry Sage – engineer
- Sleeve design by Me Company
- Distributed by The Cartel
