= Cowboys and Aliens (album) =

Studio album by Kitchens of Distinction
- Released: 3 October 1994
- Recorded: Summer/Autumn 1993
- Studio: Radio King Studio in Kippford, Scotland
- Genre: Shoegaze, dream pop, alternative rock
- Length: 51:12
- Label: One Little Indian
- Producer: Kitchens of Distinction, Pascal Gabriel, Pete Bartlett

Kitchens of Distinction chronology
The Death of Cool (1992)	Cowboys and Aliens (1994)	Capsule: The Best of KOD 1988–94 (2003)

Singles from The Death of Cool
- 1. "Now It's Time to Say Goodbye" Released: September 1994; 2. "Cowboys and Aliens" Released: January 1995 (promo only)

Professional ratings
Review scores
Source	Rating
Allmusic	4/5 stars

Cowboys and Aliens is the fourth studio album by British alternative rock band Kitchens of Distinction, released on 3 October 1994 in the UK by One Little Indian Records and on 24 January 1995 by A&M Records in the US.

The album was recorded in Kippford, Scotland at Pete Bartlett's Radio King studio through the summer and autumn of 1993. One Little Indian rejected the album twice, and eventually, both label and band agreed to bring in up-and-coming producer Pascal Gabriel to work on a couple of tracks. One of the label's complaints about the album as the band originally submitted it was that they felt it lacked a potential hit single, so Gabriel produced a new song ("Come on Now") that the band had written after the rest of the album had already been recorded; Gabriel also remixed two of the album's other tracks (the opener "Sand on Fire" and first single "Now It's Time to Say Goodbye," which peaked at number 86 on the UK Singles Chart). Although the band admitted that they enjoyed working with Gabriel, the changes did nothing to help the album's lacklustre sales. By the end of 1995, both A&M and OLI had dropped the band.

Following the album's release, the band shortened their name to Kitchens O.D. and recorded and released the non-album single "Feel My Genie"/"To Love a Star" in May 1996 before disbanding.

== Track listing ==
All tracks are written by Kitchens of Distinction.

No.	Title	Length
1.	"Sand on Fire"	4:42
2.	"Get Over Yourself"	3:13
3.	"Thought He Had Everything"	4:46
4.	"Cowboys and Aliens"	4:42
5.	"Come on Now"	3:56
6.	"Remember Me?"	4:41
7.	"One of Those Sometimes Is Now"	5:38
8.	"Here Come the Swans"	6:36
9.	"Now It's Time to Say Goodbye"	3:45
10.	"Pierced"	3:22
11.	"Prince of Mars"	5:51

== Singles ==
- "Now It's Time to Say Goodbye" (September 1994)
  1. "Now It's Time to Say Goodbye"
  2. "Jesus Nevada"
  3. "White Horses"
  4. "What We Really Wanted to Do"

== Personnel ==
Kitchens of Distinction

- Patrick Fitzgerald – vocals, bass
- Julian Swales – guitar
- Dan Goodwin – drums, percussion

Technical

- Producers: Kitchens of Distinction and Pete Bartlett, except:
  - "Come on Now" produced by Pascal Gabriel
- "Sand on Fire" and "Now It's Time to Say Goodbye" remixed by Pascal Gabriel
- Katie Meehan – vocals on "Sand on Fire", "Get Over Yourself", "Remember Me?" and "Now It's Time to Say Goodbye"
- Harvey Brough – string arrangements on "Come on Now"
- Richard Lohr – photography
- Design by Cactus
- Recorded and mixed at Kippford, Scotland
- Studio conceived and installed by Pete Bartlett
- Vibes by Kristine Filer
- Mastered at Metropolis by Tim Young
