= Škocjan =

Škocjan is a Slovene place name that may refer to several places in Slovenia or nearby (in Austria and Italy).

== Slovenia ==
Settlements

- Rakov Škocjan, a settlement in the Municipality of Cerknica, southwestern Slovenia
- Škocjan, Divača, a settlement in the Municipality of Divača, southwestern Slovenia
- Škocjan, Domžale, a settlement in the Municipality of Domžale, central Slovenia
- Škocjan, Grosuplje, a settlement in the Municipality of Grosuplje, central Slovenia
- Škocjan, Koper, a settlement in the City Municipality of Koper, southwestern Slovenia
- Škocjan, Škocjan, a settlement in the Municipality of Škocjan, southeastern Slovenia

Landforms

- Rak Škocjan, a valley and a landscape park near Rakov Škocjan in the Municipality of Cerknica, southwestern Slovenia
- Škocjan Caves, caves near Škocjan in the Municipality of Divača, southwestern Slovenia
  - Škocjan Caves Regional Park

Municipality

- Municipality of Škocjan, a municipality in southeastern Slovenia

== Outside Slovenia ==
Austria

- Škocjan v Podjuni, German Sankt Kanzian am Klopeiner See, a municipality in the Austrian state of Carinthia.
- Kanzianiberg, a hamlet in the Municipality of Finkenstein am Faaker See, Carinthia

Italy

- Škocjan ob Soči, Italian San Canzian d'Isonzo, a municipality in Friuli – Venezia Giulia.
