= Zayas (surname) =

Origin
- Language: Spanish
- Meaning: Derived from Basque zai, meaning watchman or guard
- Region of origin: Castile, Spain

Zayas is a Castilian surname rooted in the toponym of the same name, which itself derives from the Basque word zai, meaning watchman or guard.

== Places ==
The following places in Spain are related to the surname Zayas:

- Zayas de Báscones, Soria (es)
- Zayas de la Torre, Soria (es)
- Zayas de Torre, Soria (es)
- Zayuelas, Soria (es)
- Zay, Navarra
- Zaya, Navarra
- Zaitua, Vizcaya
- Záitegui, Álava

== People ==
Notable people with the surname Zayas or one of its variations include:

- Ada Zayas-Bazán, Cuban writer
- Agustín de las Cuentas Zayas, Spanish Governor of Sonora (es)
- Alberto Álvarez de Zayas, Cuban botanist
- Alberto Zayas, Cuban rumba musician
- Alexandra Zayas, American investigative reporter
- Alfonso de Zayas de Bobadilla, Spanish aristocrat and Falange supporter (es)
- Alfonso Zayas, Mexican actor (es)
- Alfred-Maurice de Zayas, Cuban-American lawyer
- Alfredo Zayas y Alfonso, President of Cuba between 1921 and 1925, brother of Juan Bruno Zayas
- Anastacio Zayas Alvarado, Puerto Rican sugarcane worker
- Ángel L. Malavé Zayas, Puerto Rican politician
- Antonio de Zayas, Spanish diplomat and writer
- Armando Zayas, Mexican orchestra director (es)
- Bigram John Zayas, American DJ and producer
- Billy Colón Zayas, Puerto Rican guitarist
- Carlos Saladrigas Zayas, Cuban politician
- Carlos Zayas, Spanish politician (es)
- César Zayas, Paraguayan footballer
- Cirilo R. Zayas, Paraguayan composer and writer
- Cristóbal de Zayas, Spanish Governor of Yucatán (es)
- Daniel de Zayas, Goya Award-winning sound engineer
- David Zayas, Puerto Rican-American actor
- Edwin Colón Zayas, Puerto Rican cuatro player
- Eliseo Roberto Colón Zayas, Puerto Rican mass media researcher
- Elizabeth Zayas Ortiz, Miss Puerto Rico 1976
- Felipe Salido Zayas, Mexican politician (es)
- Fernando de Zayas, Cuban entomologist
- Francisco Zayas Seijo, Puerto Rican politician
- Gabriel de Zayas, Spanish Secretary of State (es)
- George de Zayas, Mexican caricature artist
- Hector de Zayas, U.S. Marine Corps officer and Navy Cross recipient
- Héctor Zayas Chardón, Puerto Rican cooperativist (es)
- Ivania Zayas Ortiz, Puerto Rican singer
- Jesús Carreras Zayas, Cuban commander (es)
- Jesús Guerra Zayas, Cuban musician and songwriter (es)
- Joel Zayas, Paraguayan football goalkeeper
- José Francisco Martí Zayas Bazán, Cuban politician and army general (es)
- José Pascual de Zayas y Chacón, commander of the Spanish Army
- Juan Alonso Zayas, Puerto Rican Second Lieutenant of the Spanish Army
- Juan Antoine y Zayas, Spanish diplomat (es)
- Juan Bruno Zayas, Cuban doctor and army general, brother of Alfredo Zayas (es)
- Liza Colón-Zayas, American actress and playwright
- Luis H. Zayas, American psychologist
- Manuel Zayas, Cuban journalist and filmmaker (es)
- María de Zayas, Spanish writer
- Marius de Zayas, Mexican artist
- Máximo Othón Zayas, Mexican politician
- Miguel Aurelio Díaz Zayas, Cuban percussionist
- Nicolás Osorio y Zayas, Spanish aristocrat (es)
- Octavio Zaya, Spanish-American art critic
- Orlando Zayas, Paraguayan beach soccer player
- Pedro Pimentel Zayas, Spanish lieutenant general (es)
- Pedro de Zayas, Spanish sculptor (es)
- Rafael de Zayas Enríquez, Mexican historian
- Ricky Zayas, Puerto Rican trumpeter and arranger
- Roberto Muñoz-Zayas, President of the Puerto Rican Athletics Federation
- Samuel Zayas, Dominican footballer
- Sergio Mancilla Zayas, Mexican politician
- Sergio Zayas, Argentine swimmer
- Tomás Rafael Rodríguez Zayas, Cuban artist
- Wampa Zayas, American heavy metal drummer
- Yoan Limonta Zayas, Cuban baseball player
- Yunior Díaz Zayas, Cuban track and field athlete

== See also ==
- Zayas, the Castilian noble family with this surname
