= Tomás (given name) =

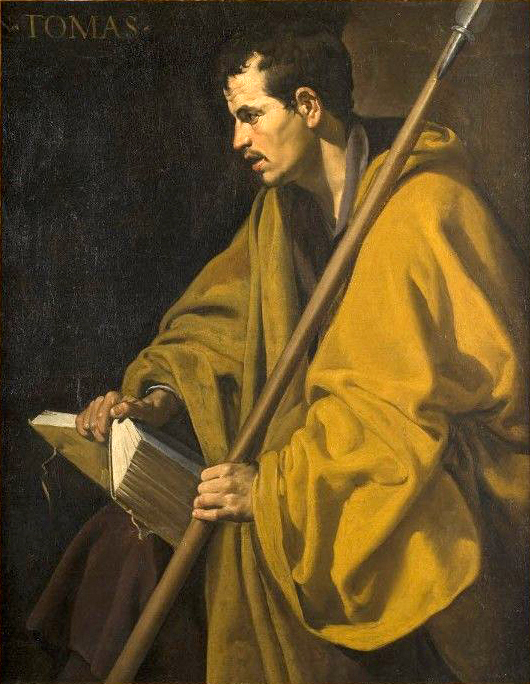
Santo Tomàs

Tomás is a Spanish, Portuguese, and Irish (also in the archaic forms Thomaz, Thomás and Tomaz) given name equivalent of Thomas.

It may refer to:

- Tomás de Anchorena (1783–1847), Argentine statesman and lawyer
- Tomás de Bhaldraithe (1916–1996), Irish language scholar and lexicographer
- Tomás de Herrera (1804–1859), Neogranadine statesman and general
- Tomás de Iriarte y Oropesa (1750–1791), Spanish neoclassical poet
- Tomás de Jesús Mangual (1944–2011), Puerto Rican crime reporter
- Tomás de la Cerda, 3rd Marquis of la Laguna (1638–1692), viceroy of New Spain
- Tomás de la Rosa (born 1978), Dominican Major League Baseball infielder
- Tomás de Rocamora (1740–1819), Argentine governor
- Tomás de Santa María (died 1570), Spanish music theorist, organist and composer
- Tomás de Teresa (born 1968), former Spanish middle distance runner
- Tomás de Torquemada (1420–1498), fifteenth century Spanish Dominican
- Tomás de Torres (16th century), Portuguese teacher, astrologer and doctor
- Tomás de Zumalacárregui (1788–1835), Spanish Carlist general
- Tomás Aldazabal (born 1976), Cuban volleyball player
- Tomás Antônio Gonzaga (1744–1809), Luso-Brazilian poet
- Tomás Argento (born 1986), Argentine field hockey striker
- Tomás Arias (1856–1932), Panamanian politician and businessman
- Tomás Batista (born 1935), Puerto Rican sculptor
- Tomás Berreta (1875–1947), Uruguayan political figure
- Tomás Bilbao (1890–1954), Basque-origin Spanish architect and politician
- Tomás Borge (1930–2012), last living co-founder of the Sandinista movement in Nicaragua
- Tomás Bretón (1850–1923), Spanish musician and composer
- Tomás Cámara y Castro (1847–1904), Catholic bishop
- Tomás Carrasquilla (1858–1940), Colombian writer
- Tomás Cipriano de Mosquera (1798–1878), Colombian general and political figure
- Tomás Corrigan (born 1990), Gaelic footballer
- Tomás Diez Acosta (1946–2023), Cuban revolutionary soldier
- Tomás Eloy Martínez (1934–2010), Argentine journalist and writer
- Tomás Estrada Palma (1832–1908), Cuban political figure
- Tomás Fernández (disambiguation), several people
- Tomás Fonzi (born 1981), Argentine actor
- Tomás Frías Ametller (1804–1884), noted politician
- Tomás Garicano (1910–1988), Spanish military lawyer and politician
- Tomás Garrido Canabal (1891–1943), Mexican politician and revolutionary
- Tomás Gil (born 1977), Venezuelan track and road cyclist
- Tomás Godoy Cruz (1791–1852), Argentine statesman and businessman
- Tomás González (born 1959), Cuban track and field sprinter
- Tomás José González-Carvajal (1753–1834), Spanish poet and statesman
- Tomás Guardia Gutiérrez (1831–1882), President of Costa Rica
- Tomás Guido (1788–1866), General in the Argentine War of Independence
- Tomás Gutiérrez Alea (1928–1996), Cuban filmmaker
- Tomás Guzmán (born 1982), Paraguayan football striker
- Tomás Harris (died 1964), Spanish-speaking officer with MI6 during World War II
- Tomás Heneghan, Irish activist
- Tomás Hirsch (born 1956), Chilean politician and businessman
- Tomas Laurenzo (born 1977), Uruguayan artist and computer scientist
- Tomás Luceño (1844–1933), Spanish poet and playwright
- Tomás Luis de Victoria (1548–1611), Spanish composer
- Tomás Mac Curtain (1884–1920), Sinn Féin Lord Mayor of Cork
- Tomás Mac Giolla (1924–2010), Irish member of parliament
- Tomás MacCormik (born 1978), field hockey midfielder
- Tomás MacDonagh (1878–1916), Irish revolutionary leader, poet, playwright and educationalist
- Tomás Maldonado (1922–2018), Argentine painter, designer and thinker
- Tomás Manuel Lopes da Silva (born 1972), Portuguese former association football goalkeeper
- Tomás Marco (born 1942), Spanish composer and writer
- Tomás Marín de Poveda (1650–1703), Spanish colonial administrator
- Tomás Martínez (1820–1873), President of Nicaragua
- Tomás Medina (1803–1884), President of El Salvador
- Tomás Mejía (1820–1867), Mexican soldier
- Tomás Méndez (1927–1995), Mexican composer and singer
- Tomás Milián (1933–2017), Cuban-American actor
- Tomás Monfil (19??-2009), Chilean forester
- Tomás Monje (1884–1959), President of Bolivia
- Tomaz Morais (born 1970), Portuguese rugby union coach
- Tomás Mulcahy (born 1963), Irish hurling manager and former player
- Tomás N. Alonso (1881–1962), Cebuano Visayan writer
- Tomás Nistal (born 1948), Spanish former road cyclist
- Tomás Ó Criomhthain (1856–1937), Irish memoirist
- Tomás Ó Fiaich (1923–1990), Irish cardinal
- Tomás Ó Sé, Irish Gaelic football player
- Tomás O'Horán y Escudero (1819–1867), Mexican-Irish General
- Tomás O'Leary (born 1983), Irish Rugby Union player
- Tomás Olias Gutiérrez (born 1969), Spanish footballer
- Tomas Osmeña (born 1948), Filipino politician, Mayor of Cebu City
- Tomás Palacios (born 2003), Argentine footballer
- Tomás Pérez (born 1973), Venezuelan Major League Baseball infielder
- Tomás Quinn, Irish Gaelic footballer
- Tomás Rafael Rodríguez Zayas (1949–2010), Cuban artist and illustrator
- Tomás Regalado (Salvadoran politician) (1861–1906), President of El Salvador
- Tomás Reñones (born 1960), Spanish football (soccer) player
- Tomaz Ribas (1918–1999), writer, ethnologist and critic of theatre and dance
- Tomás Rivera (1935–1984), Chicano author, poet, and educator
- Tomás Romero Pereira (1886–1982), President of Paraguay
- Tomás Ruíz González (born 1963), Mexican politician
- Tomás Ryan, Irish former hurling player
- Tomaz Salomão (born 1954), Mozambican economist
- Tomás Sánchez (born 1948), Cuban painter
- Tomás Taveira (born 1938), Portuguese architect
- Tomás Teresen (born 1987), Venezuelan road cyclist
- Tomás Torres Mercado, Mexican politician
- Tomás Valladares, President of Nicaragua
- Tomaz Vieira da Cruz (1900–1960), Portuguese poet
- Tomás Yarrington (born 1957), Mexican politician

== See also ==
- Santo Tomás (disambiguation)
- Thomaz (disambiguation)
