= Monedero =

Monedero is a surname. Notable people with the surname include:

- Ángel Lizcano Monedero (1846–1929), Spanish painter and illustrator
- Juan Carlos Monedero (born 1963), Spanish political scientist and politician
