= Škocjan Caves =

Cave system in Slovenia

UNESCO World Heritage Site
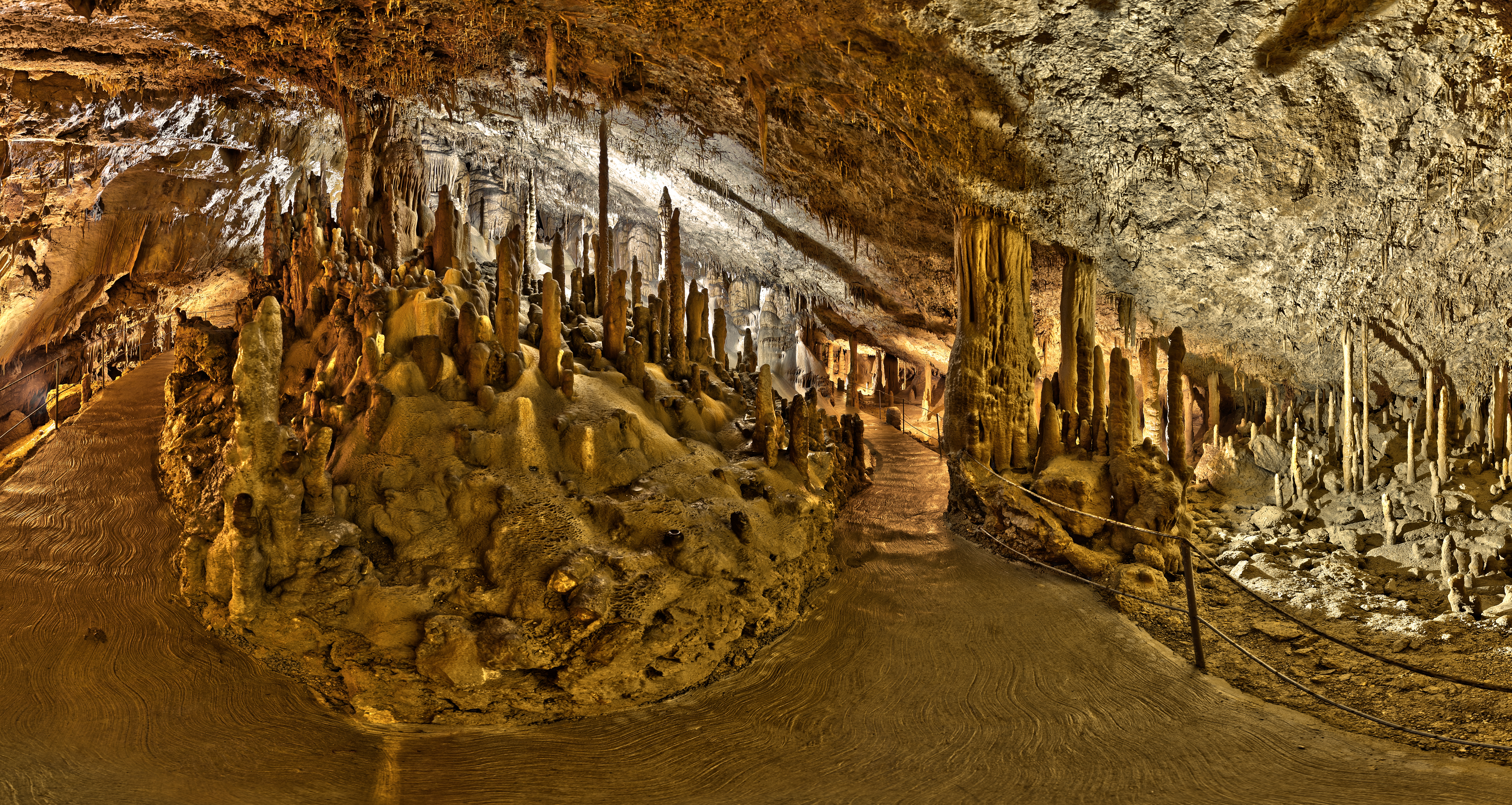

- Location within Slovenia
- Location: Slovenia
- Criteria: Natural: (vii), (viii)
- Reference: 390
- Inscription: 1986 (10th Session)
- Area: 413 ha (1,020 acres)
- Website: www.park-skocjanske-jame.si
- Coordinates: 45°40′N 14°0′E

Ramsar Wetland
- Official name: Skocjanske Jame
- Designated: 21 May 1999
- Reference no.: 991

Škocjan Caves (pronounced [ˈʃkɔːtsjan]; Slovene: Škocjanske jame, Italian: Grotte di San Canziano) is a cave system located in Slovenia. Škocjan Caves was included on UNESCO’s list of natural and cultural World Heritage Sites in 1986. Škocjan Caves is a significant underground phenomenon on the Karst Plateau and in Slovenia. After gaining independence from Yugoslavia in 1991, Slovenia made a commitment to actively protect the Škocjan Caves area. To fulfill this commitment, Škocjan Caves Regional Park was established, along with its managing authority, the Škocjan Caves Park Public Service Agency.

== Description ==
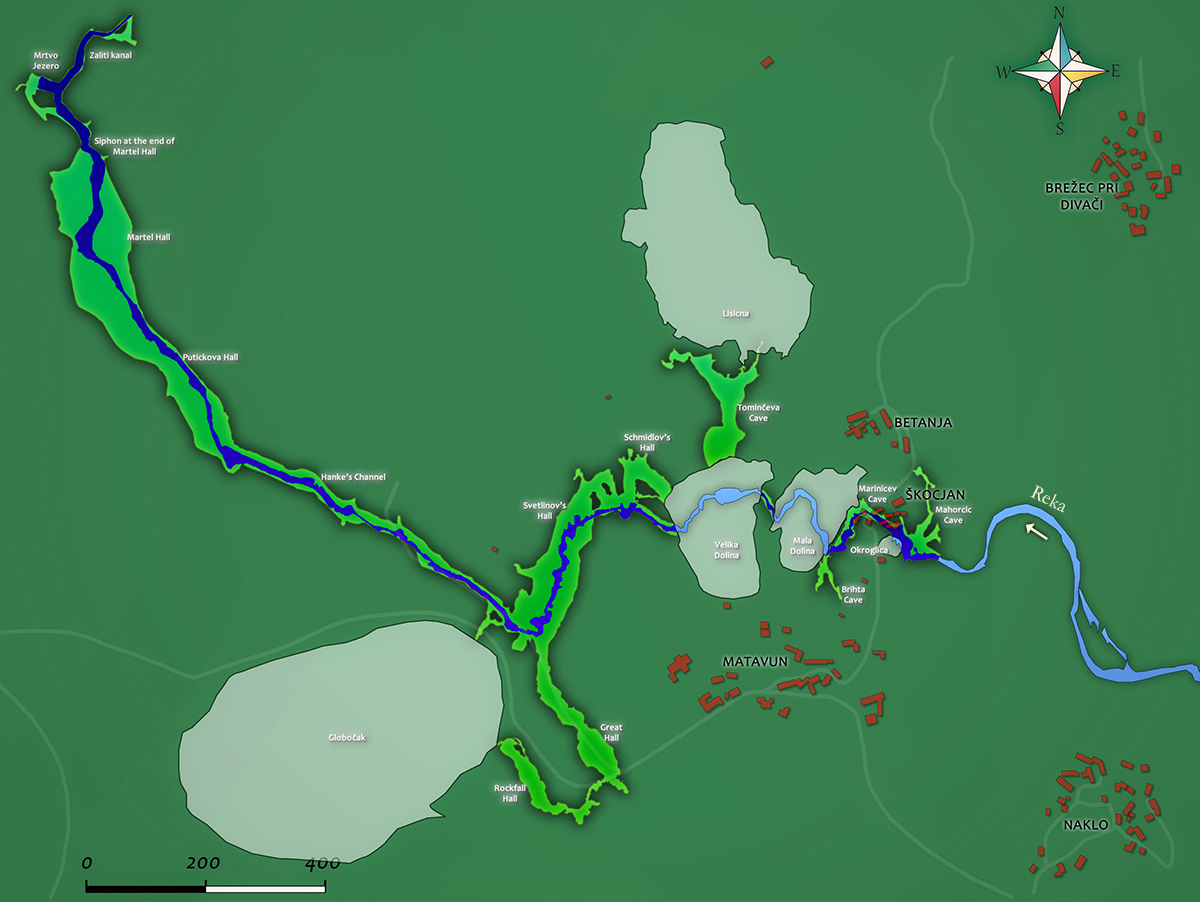
Map of Škocjan Caves

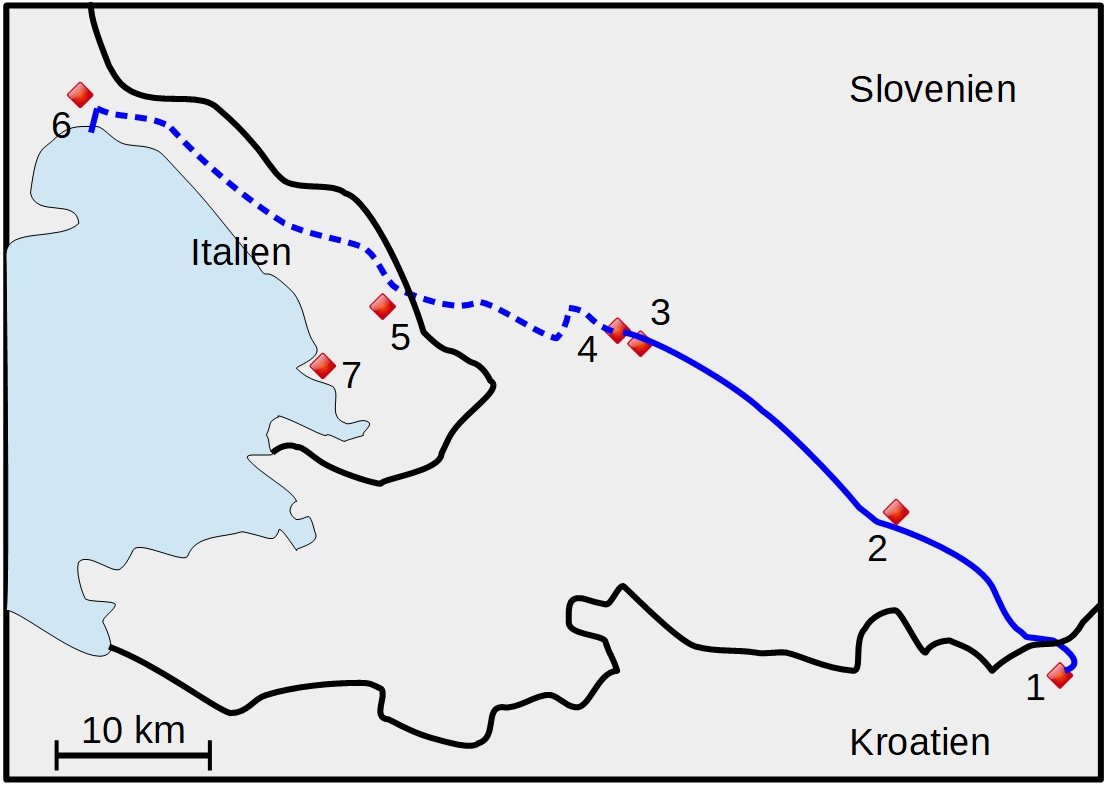
The Reka–Timavo karst river system in Croatia, Slovenia, and Italy: solid line = surface flow, dashed line = subterranean. Settlements: Croatia; 1. Vela Voda; Slovenia; 2. Ilirska Bistrica; 3. Vremski Britof; 4. Škocjan / Italy; 5. Trebiciano; 6. Monfalcone; 7. Trieste

Škocjan Caves is an underground phenomenon in the Karst region and Slovenia. It was designated as Ramsar wetlands of international importance on May 18, 1999. Along with the underground stream of the Reka River, it forms one of the longest karst underground wetlands in Europe.

The explored length of the caves is 6,200 meters (20,300 feet). The caves have formed in a 300-meter-thick (980-foot) layer of Cretaceous and Paleocene limestone.

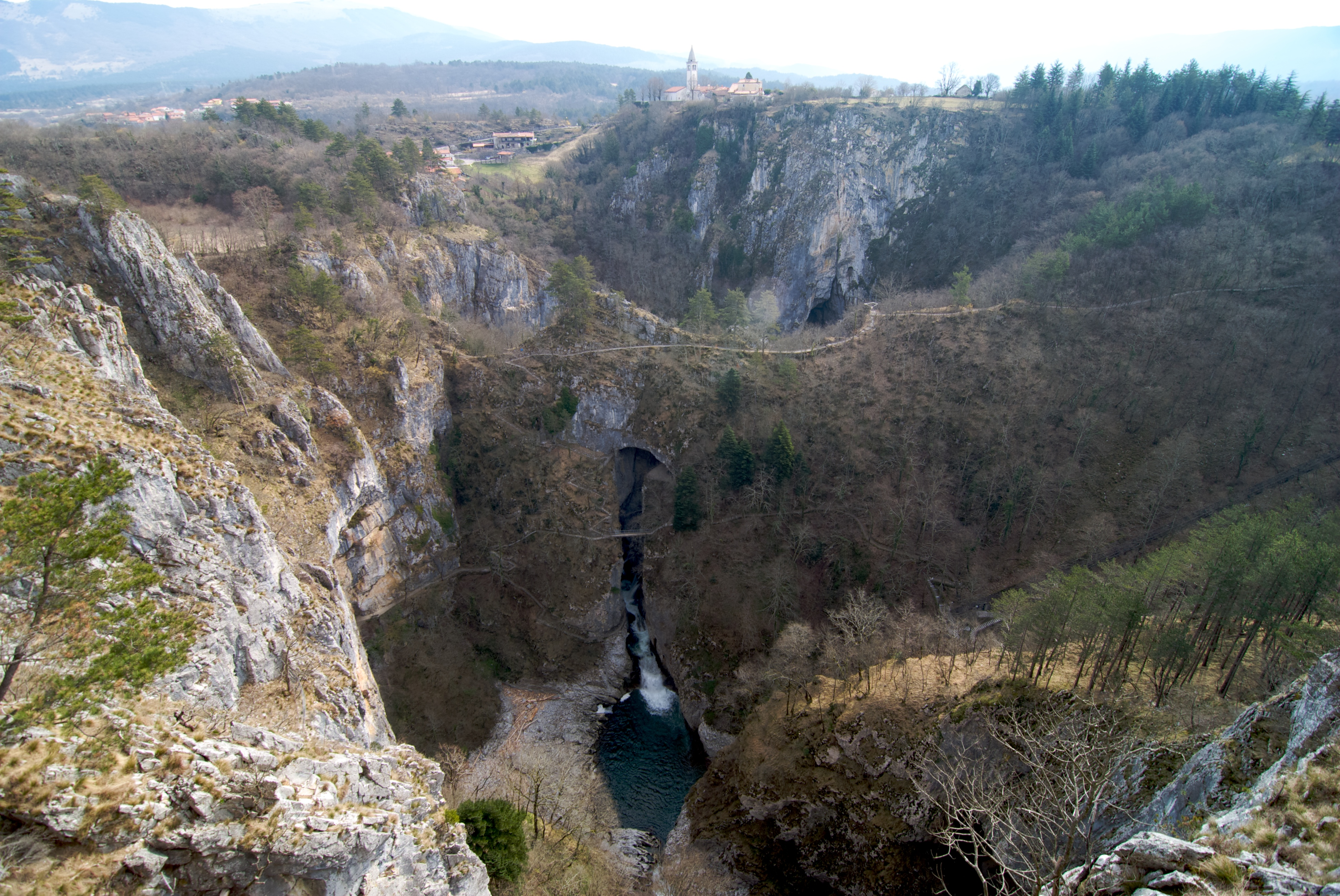
The Big Collapse Doline and Little Collapse Doline in Škocjan are where the cave entrances are located, situated at the bottom of the two collapse dolines.

At the Big Collapse Doline (Slovene: Velika Dolina), the Reka River disappears underground into Škocjan Caves and then flows underground for 34 kilometers (21 miles), resurfacing near Monfalcone. There, it contributes approximately one-third of the flow of the Timavo River, which travels 2 kilometers (1.2 miles) from the Timavo Springs to the Adriatic Sea.

The river flowing through the canyon turns northwest before the Cerkvenik Bridge and continues along Hanke's Channel (Slovene: Hankejev kanal). This underground channel is approximately 3.5 kilometers (2.2 miles) long, 10 to 60 meters (33 to 197 ft) wide, and over 140 meters (460 feet) high. It expands into underground chambers at certain points, with the largest being Martel's Chamber. With a volume of 2.2 million cubic meters (78 million cubic feet), it is considered the largest discovered underground chamber in Europe and one of the largest in the world. The canyon ends with a relatively small siphon that cannot handle the immense volume of water during heavy rainfall, leading to significant flooding. During such events, water levels can rise by more than one hundred meters (330 feet).

=== Fauna ===
Lepidoptera include Zygaena lonicerae.

== History ==
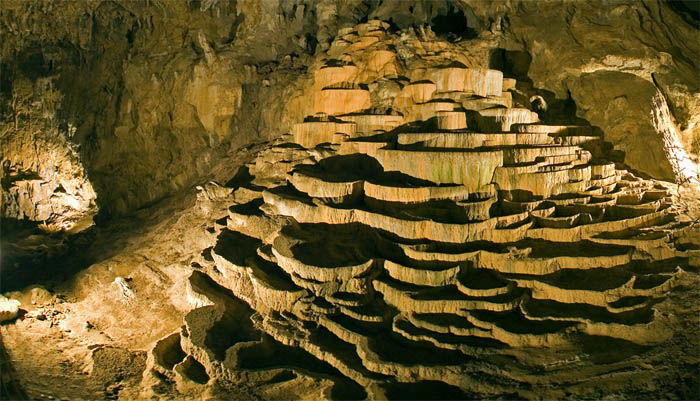
Rimstone Pools in Škocjan Caves

The first written sources about Škocjan Caves date back to the Antiquity era (2nd century B.C.) by Posidonius of Apamea. They are also marked on the oldest published maps of the region, such as the Lazius-Ortelius map from 1561 and Mercator's Novus Atlas from 1637. The commissioning of the French painter Louis-François Cassas in 1782 to paint landscape pieces further attests to the caves' significance as an important natural feature in the Trieste hinterland during the 18th century. His paintings depict visits to the bottom of the Big Collapse Doline (Slovene: Velika dolina). In 1689, the Carniolan scholar Johann Weikhard von Valvasor described the sink of the Reka River and its underground flow.

An attempt was made to follow the underground course of the Reka River in order to provide Trieste with drinking water. The deep shafts in the Karst region, as well as Škocjan Caves, were explored for this purpose. The systematic exploration of Škocjan Caves began with a speleology expedition in 1884. Explorers reached the banks of Mrtvo jezero (Dead Lake) in 1890. The discovery of Silent Cave (Slovene: Tiha jama) in 1904 marked a significant achievement when local men climbed the sixty-meter (200 ft) wall of Müller Hall (Slovene: Müllerjeva dvorana). Nearly 100 years after the discovery of Dead Lake (Slovene: Mrtvo jezero), another important event occurred in 1990. Slovenian divers successfully swam through the Ledeni dihnik siphon and discovered over 200 meters (660 feet) of new cave passages.

== Archaeology ==
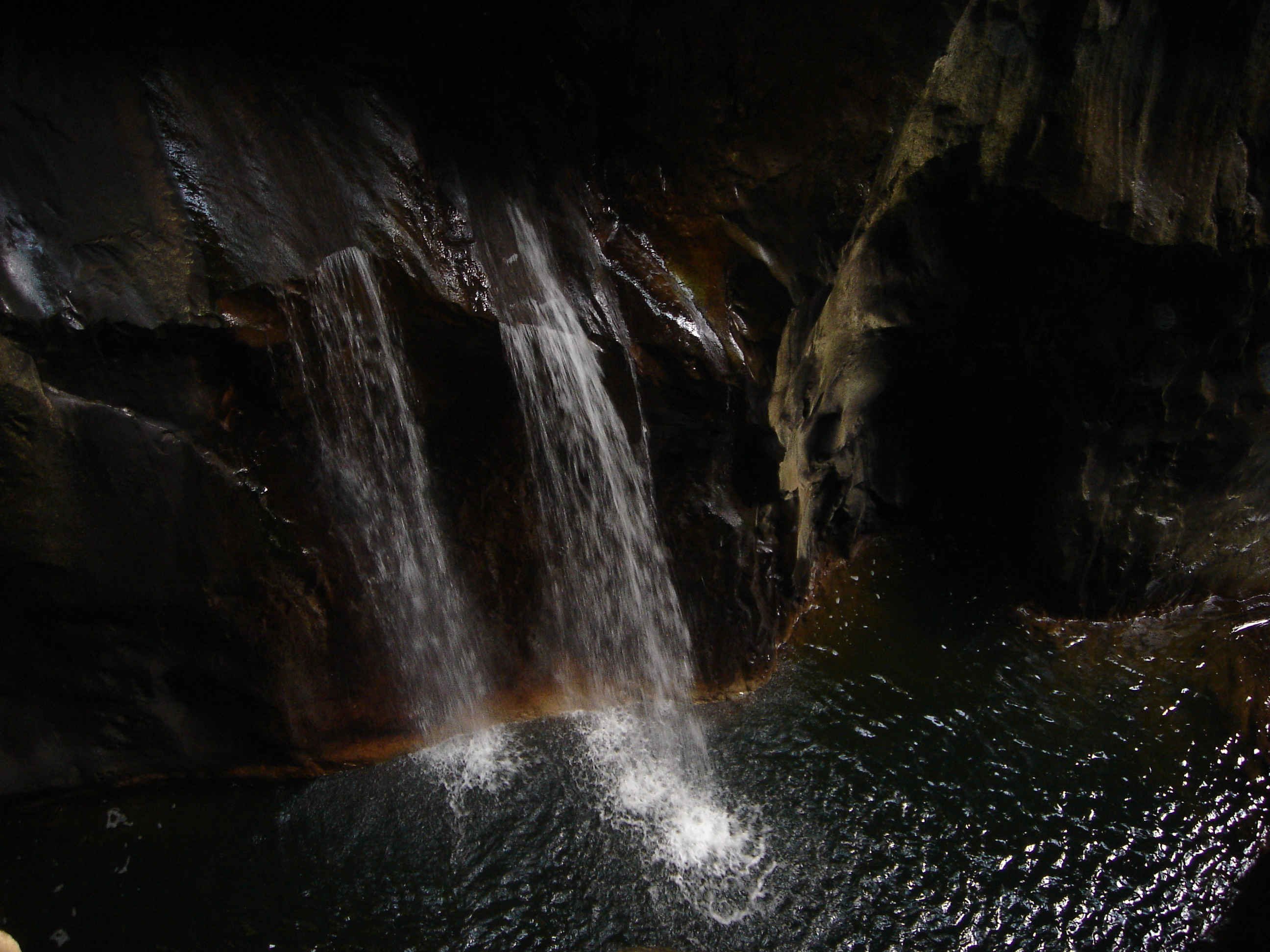
Tiny waterfall inside Škocjan Caves

For countless generations, the gorge where the Reka River disappears underground and the cave entrances have captivated people. The Reka River sinks beneath a rocky wall, with the village of Škocjan situated on top, lending its name to the caves. Škocjan Caves Regional Park holds immense archaeological value, with evidence of human habitation dating back over ten thousand years. A remarkable archaeological discovery in Fly Cave (Slovene: Mušja jama) indicates the influence of Greek civilization. Following the Bronze Age and into the Iron Age, a cave temple was established in this area. Three thousand years ago, this region held great significance as a pilgrimage site, particularly within the Mediterranean, where it played a crucial role in ancestral worship and communication with the afterlife.

== Tourism ==
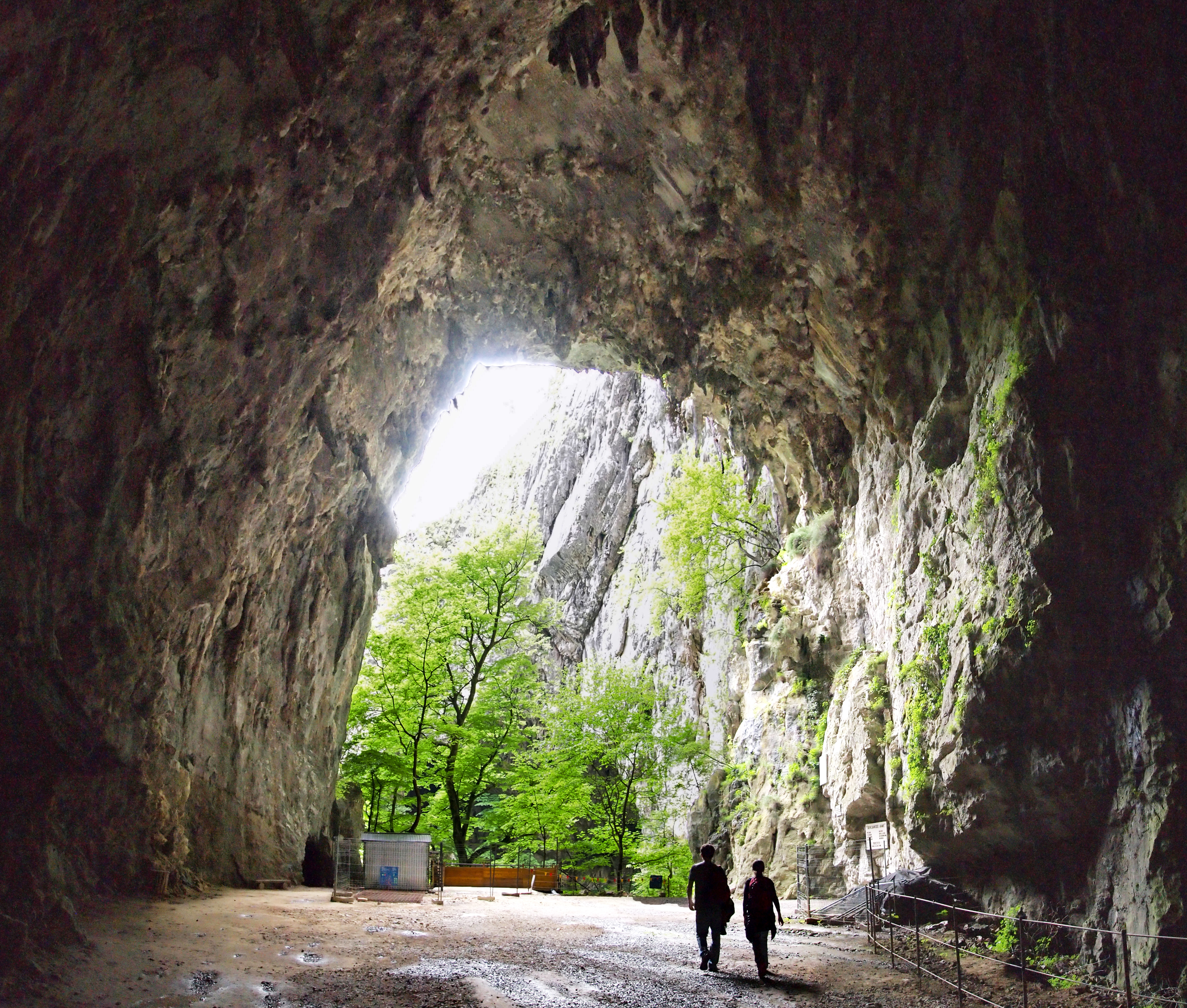
Škocjan Caves entrance

Determining the exact start of tourism in Škocjan Caves is challenging. According to speleologist Trevor Shaw, in 1819, Matej Tominc, a county councilor (after whom Tominc Cave is named), ordered the construction of steps leading to the bottom of Big Collapse Doline, which were completed in 1823 (Slovene: Velika Dolina). Other sources suggest that the steps were simply renovated during that time. On 1 January 1819, a visitors' book was introduced, marking the beginning of modern tourism in Škocjan Caves.

In recent years, Škocjan Caves have had approximately 100,000 visitors annually. The first section of the caves, consisting of Marinič Cave and Mahorčič Cave with Little Collapse Doline (Slovene: Mala Dolina), was opened to tourists by 1933. However, it suffered severe damage during a flood in 1963. In 2011, the area was renovated, and a new steel bridge was added. Visitors now have the opportunity to explore the underground canyon featuring Big Collapse Doline (Slovene: Velika Dolina). Guided tours of the cave are available in Slovenian, English, Italian, and German.

== See also ==
- List of deepest Dinaric caves
- List of longest Dinaric caves
