= La inocencia castigada =

Book by María de Zayas y Sotomayor

Innocence Punished
- Author: María de Zayas y Sotomayor
- Original title: La inocencia castigada
- Language: Spanish
- Publication place: Spain
- Media type: Print

La inocencia castigada (English: Innocence Punished) is a Spanish language novel by María de Zayas y Sotomayor, from the collection Desengaños amorosos (English: Amorous Disenchantments). It was published during Spain's Golden Age, and is a tragedy about a misunderstanding which leads to the kidnapping and torture of an innocent woman.

== Plot ==
Don Diego, a womanizing knight, falls in love with the beautiful Doña Inés, wife of Don Alonso. Her poor neighbor takes notice and borrows a dress from the lady under the pretense of needing it to wear to a wedding. She then hires a prostitute who resembles Inés to pose as her in order to have sexual relations with Diego in exchange for gifts. When it comes time to return the dress, they end the arrangement. Diego approaches Inés to ask why she broke off their relationship, which confuses her greatly, until he mentions that she always wore the dress she is wearing at the moment when they were together. The dress is the one that she lent to the neighbor, so she realizes that he must have been tricked, and seeks help from the Mayor, who sees to it that the two women involved are punished.

Diego, embarrassed but still in love with Inés, seeks help from a Moorish necromancer, who gives him a candle shaped like the object of his unrequited love. When he lights the candle, a demon will possess Inés, forcing her to come to his bedchamber and submit to him. He is warned not to extinguish the candle before she is back in her own bed or she will die. Diego begins to use the candle while Don Alonso is out of town on business. Inés is conscious of what is happening, but doesn't understand it and thinks she is having vivid nightmares. One night she is discovered walking in a trance through the street in only a shirt by the Mayor and her brother, Don Francisco. They follow her and discover what Diego has been up to. He warns them not to extinguish the candle until she is back in her own bed. She returns to her room and awakens, surrounded by strange men who work for the Mayor, and is distraught with fear and guilt when she learns what has been happening to her. Diego is taken to the authorities and is never seen again.

Her brother, husband, and sister-in-law, convinced that Inés is guilty of adultery and has therefore brought dishonor upon the family, kidnap her and take her to Seville, where they hole her up inside a chimney in a place so small she is unable to stand or sit, but must crouch. They leave a tiny window to allow her to breathe and eat paltry meals, so that she will die very slowly. She is left here for six years, surrounded by trash and excrement, without light or the ability to lie down. She never gives up her faith in God and constantly prays for death or release, and is further tormented by her inability to celebrate the sacraments.

Finally, a woman moves in next door into a room with sufficiently close proximity to the chimney to hear the lamentations of Inés. She asks who the woman is, and Inés tells her the story of how she came to be held captive. The next day the woman seeks help from the Mayor and Archbishop, who promptly go to the house of Alonso and Francisco and tear down the wall. Inés is now blind, having lost her sight due to never seeing light, her hair tangled and covered with lice, her body covered in open wounds infested with worms. The Archbishop sends the three evil relatives to prison, and they are later condemned to death by hanging. Inés is cured and restored to her former beauty, though she never regains her sight, and enters a convent, where she spends the rest of her days.
