= Tomaz =

Tomaz may refer to:

- Tomaž, Slovene given name
- Tomaz (given name), an archaic Portuguese form of the male given name Tomás
- Adrianna Tomaz, a fictional character from DC Comics
- Zari Tomaz, a fictional character from the TV series Legends of Tomorrow
