= Tomaž =

Tomaž is the Slovene form of the male given name Thomas.

== People ==
Bearers of these names include:

- Tomaž Barada, Slovenian martial artist
- Tomaž Čižman (born 1965), Slovenian alpine skier
- Tomaž Humar (born 1969), Slovenian mountaineer
- Tomaž Jemc (born 1964), Slovenian alpine skier
- Tomaž Lazar (born 1982), Slovenian historian and curator
- Anton Tomaž Linhart (1756–1795), Slovene playwright and historian
- Tomaž Marušič (born 1932), Slovenian lawyer and politician
- Tomaž Ocvirk, Slovenian handball coach
- Tomaž Pengov, Slovenian guitar player
- Tomaž Pirih (born 1981), Slovenian rower
- Tomaž Pisanski (born 1949), Slovenian mathematician
- Tomaž Razingar, Slovenian ice hockey player
- Tomaž Šalamun (born 1941), Slovenian poet

== See also ==
- Sveti Tomaž (disambiguation) (Saint Thomas), several places in Slovenia
