= Škocjan Caves Regional Park =

Coordinates: 45°39′47.39″N 13°59′21.55″E

Škocjan Caves Regional Park is located in the Škocjan Karst, a vast flat landscape that lies at an elevation between 420 and 450 m in the southeast part of the Karst area. Following its independence, Slovenia committed itself to protecting the Škocjan Caves area; for this reason, it established Škocjan Caves Regional Park and its managing authority, the Škocjan Caves Park Public Service Agency.

== Position and surface ==
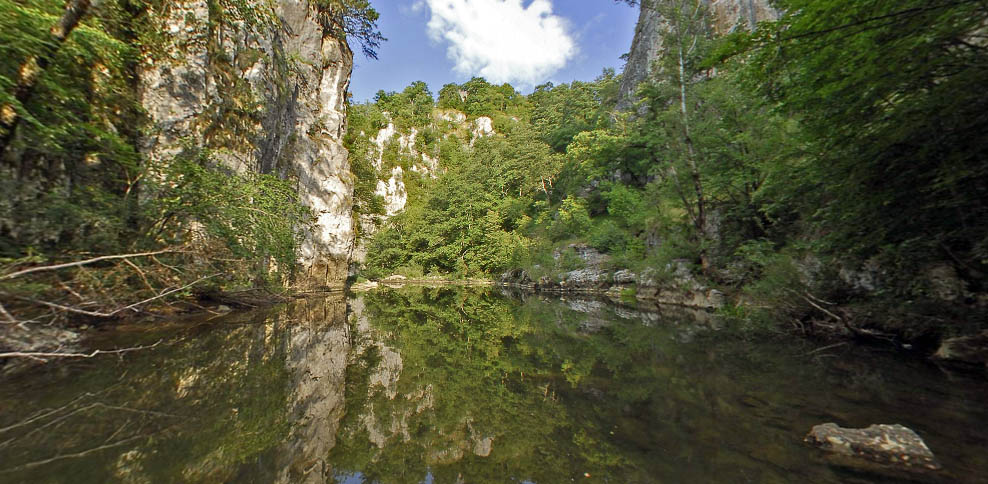
The Reka Gorge

The narrow protected area covers 4.15 km^{2} and encompasses the area above Škocjan Caves, the Reka Gorge, and the surrounding collapse dolines. It comprises the villages of Škocjan, Betanja, and Matavun. The area of influence of the park comprises the entire Reka River watershed and covers 450 km^{2}. It lies at the extensive junction of the karst and nonkarst areas. At the easternmost border of the area of influence, the 1,796 m Mount Snežnik reigns; it is the highest non-alpine mountain in Slovenia.

At first sight, the Škocjan Karst surface appears to be flat, but in reality it is very dynamic. This characteristic landscape that developed in limestones is named karst, derived from the name of the Karst area. The solubility of rocks that form the Earth's surface is the most effective agent of karstification. Falling water in the Karst sinks and drains underground through fissures. The caves are formed in this way; on the surface this occurs in different karst depressions of various sizes. The most frequent karst depressions are sinkholes.

== Natural heritage ==
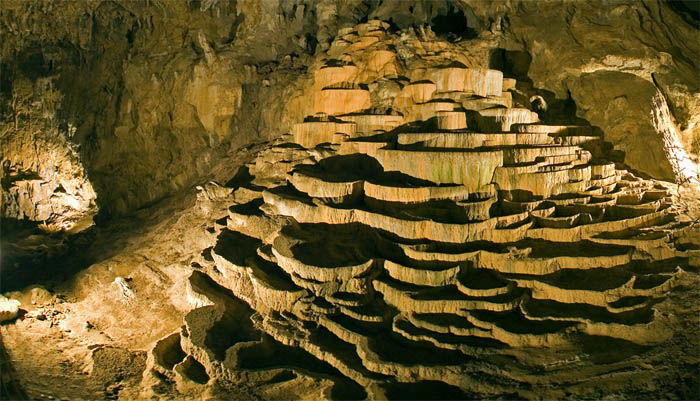
Limestone polls in the Škocjan Caves

Natural heritage in the protected area is protected by law. In 1996, the following natural phenomena from Škocjan Caves Regional Park were declared to be natural monuments due to their outstanding natural and aesthetic value:

- Mala dolina and Velika dolina all the way to the collapse doline edge
- Okroglica abyss
- Walls and banks of the Reka Valley in the radius of 150 m before the entry into Mahorčič Cave
- Caves in the area of the Park:

- Škocjan Caves (Škocjan cave system)
- Jama na Prevali II. (Mušja jama)
- Mala jama na Prevali (Skeletna jama)
- Škrlica Cave

- the stalactite in Lipje Caves near Divača.

== Flora and fauna ==
Škocjan Caves, a well-known and well-explored outstanding natural phenomenon, has long been recognized as exceptional due to its extremely varied terrain and exceptionally diverse flora and fauna. Collapse dolines and their surroundings offer shelter to rare and endangered bird species and several bat species, and an extraordinary ecosystem that has developed due to particular geomorphologic and microclimatic conditions has been preserved. The underground is rich with several species of cave animals: both those living on land and those living in water.

== The Reka River ==
The cave was formed by the disappearing Reka River, which gathers most of its waters on the impermeable flysch rock. It flows from the Škocjan Caves through the Karst underground and emerges to the surface in Italy some 35 km away at the springs of the Timavo River. Its flow is for the most part unknown and can only be reached in few deep shafts (up to 320 m deep), but the siphons hinder any further exploration along the underground channels.
During a high water period, the Reka River flow can exceed 300 cubic m per second. Because of this, following heavy rains, it floods in the cave, usually reaching levels up to 30 m; the highest recorded rise in the water level was 132 m.

== Cultural heritage ==
From time immemorial, the landscape in the area of Škocjan Caves Park has attracted people; it is exceptionally rich in archaeological sites. The nature of this area is also reflected in the preserved medieval ground plan of the village of Škocjan and its position on a large natural bridge beneath which the Reka River carved out Mahorčič and Marinič caves. This position is not coincidental. The village of Škocjan, named after the church of St. Cantianius (sv. Kancijan), was presumably settled in the prehistoric period and undoubtedly in the Roman period. It was around this church that the village developed, leaning on the partly preserved hill fort walls inside which it is situated.

In present times, the village is almost deserted except for during the tourist season, when visitors to the two permanent museum exhibitions bring it back to life. Škocjan is so far registered as settlement monument in the park.

Cultural heritage properties in the area are protected by law and since 1996 some structures have been declared as cultural monuments due to their special value. Since then, the park contains various settlement monuments, archaeological monuments, historical art monuments, ethnological monuments, technical monuments, and historical monuments.

== Area of influence ==
The area of influence of Škocjan Caves Regional Park encompasses the entire Reka River drainage basin and covers 450 km^{2}. It includes the Snežnik mountain chain, the Reka Valley, Brkini, Vremščica, the Košana Valley, Prestranško-slavinski ravnik, Sajevško polje, and the Škocjan Caves Park area.
