= Trevor Shaw =

Trevor Shaw may refer to:

- Jimmy London (reggae singer), Jamaican reggae singer, born Trevor Shaw
- Trevor Ian Shaw, English experimental biologist
- T. R. Shaw (Trevor R. Shaw), English historian and speleologist
