= Ocvirk =

Ocvirk is a surname. Notable people with the surname include:

- Gregor Ocvirk (born 1998), Slovenian handball player
- Larisa Ocvirk (born 1997), Slovenian basketball player
- Tomaž Ocvirk (fl. 21st century), Slovenian handball coach
