= Ángel Lizcano Monedero =

Spanish painter (1846–1929)

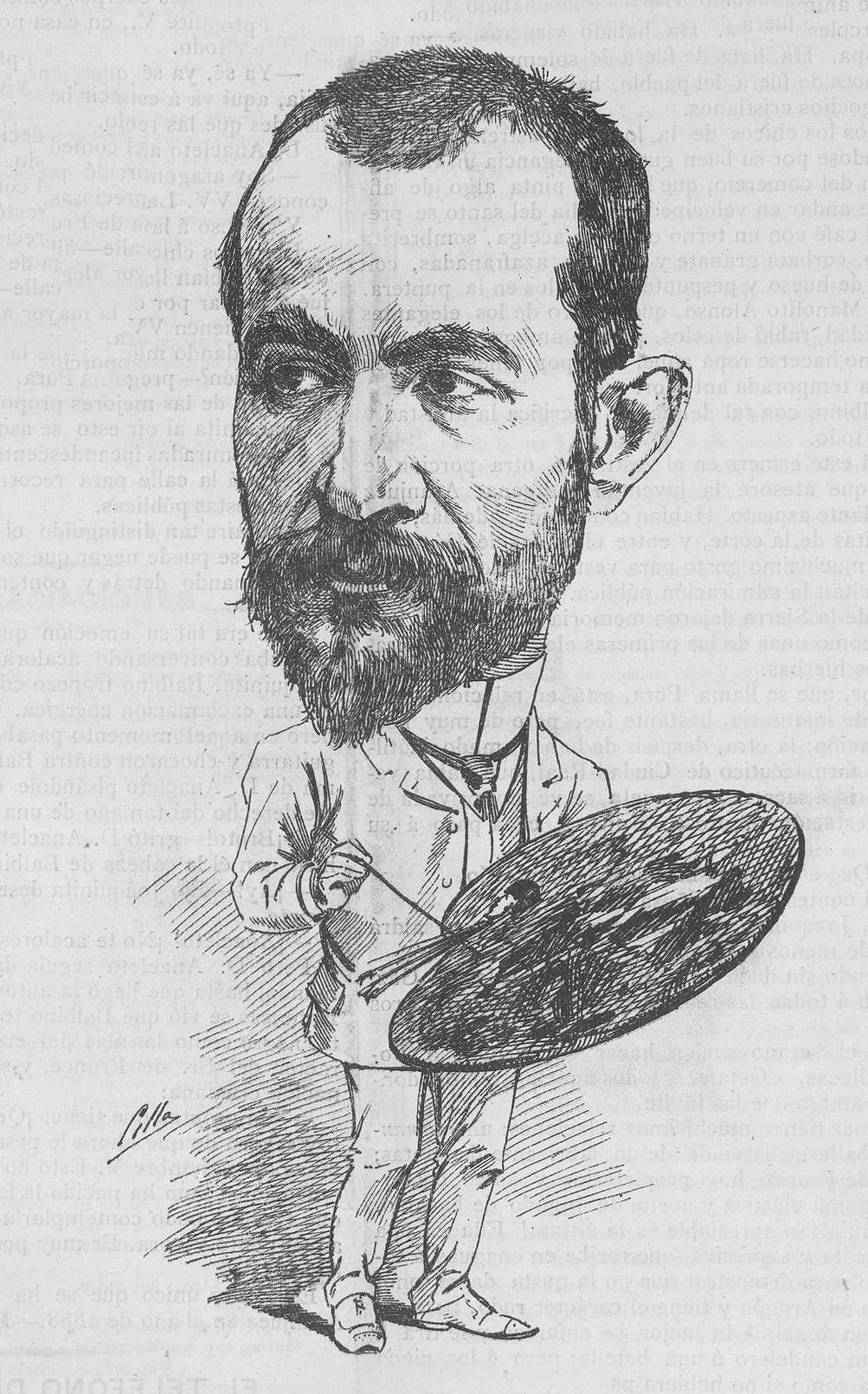
Ángel Lizcano

Ángel Lizcano Monedero y Esteban (24 November 1846 – 31 July 1929) was a Spanish painter and illustrator. He specialized in Costumbrista and historical scenes.

== Biography ==
Monedero was born in Alcázar de San Juan (Castile-La Mancha). When he was seven, his family moved to Madrid to open a bookstore. At the age of fourteen, he began his art studies at the Real Academia de Bellas Artes de San Fernando, where he graduated with honors. He continued his education by copying the Old Masters at the Museo del Prado.

In 1869, he received a stipend from Manuel Antonio, Marqués de Bedmar, to complete his studies in Italy. Later, he toured much of Spain and participated in the National Exposition of Fine Arts, where he sold a painting to King Amedeo I. All together, he received four medals at various expositions from 1876 to 1887. For many years, he continued to work as an itinerant artist.

He also gained a reputation as an illustrator and engraver, providing images for a wide variety of magazines, books and posters; over 800 in all. La Ilustración Española y Americana was one of his most favored periodicals. Among his best known book illustrations were those for the Episodios Nacionales by Benito Pérez Galdós, and theatrical pieces by Vital Aza, Tomás Luceño, Miguel Ramos Carrión and Ricardo de la Vega. He also illustrated classics, including the sainetes of Ramón de la Cruz. Some of his works were adapted for postcards by the French photographer, Jean Laurent.

At the age of fifty, due to the death of his wife, he began to suffer from mental disorders, although he continued to paint and was named a Professor of Drawing at the Círculo de Bellas Artes. Later, the quality of his work began to suffer as he created rapidly produced bullfight scenes and other popular images to maintain his income. When his mental state had made it almost impossible for him to paint, the Círculo voted to provide him with an annual pension. In 1929, he had to be admitted to the asylum at the Hospital de Santa Isabel, Leganés, where he died.

In 1994, the Municipal Museum of Alcázar de San Juan presented his works in the exhibition “The Painter Ángel Lizcano in the Ramos-Cárdenas Family”. Other major retrospectives of his work were held in his hometown in 1967 and 1996.

== Selected paintings ==
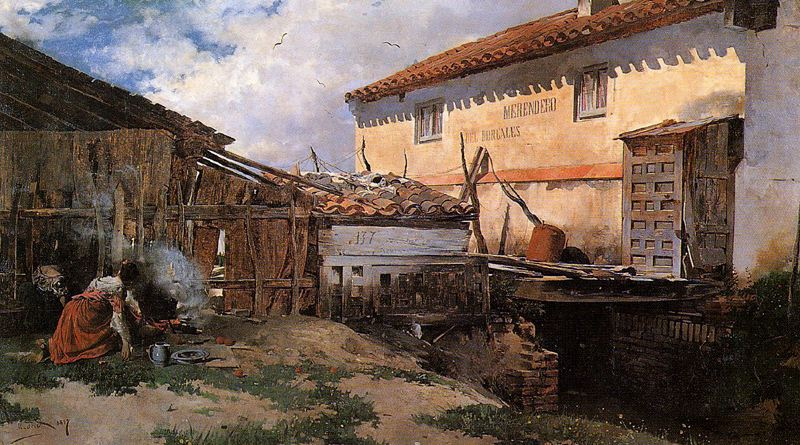
Picnic

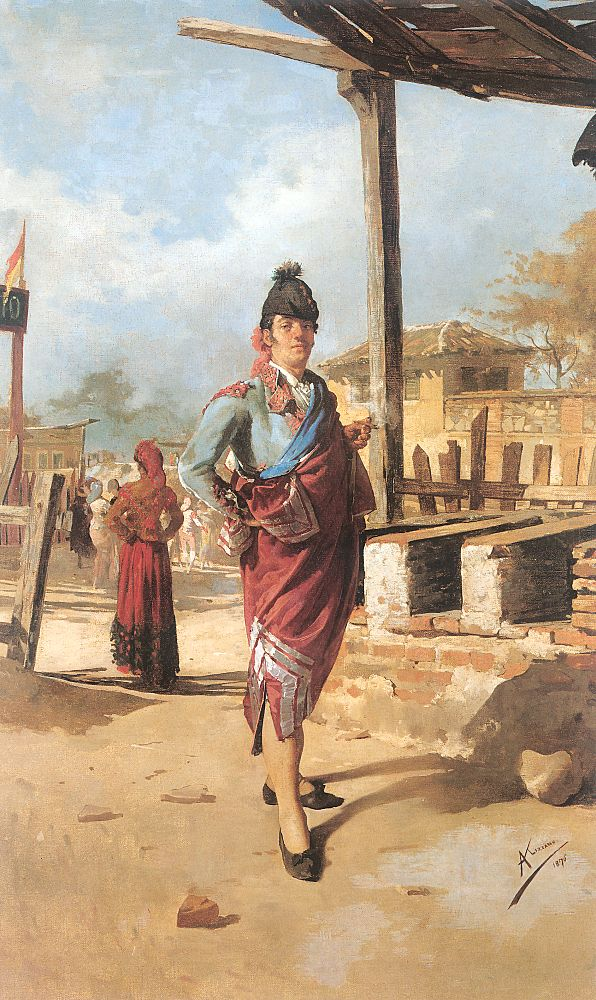
The Toff

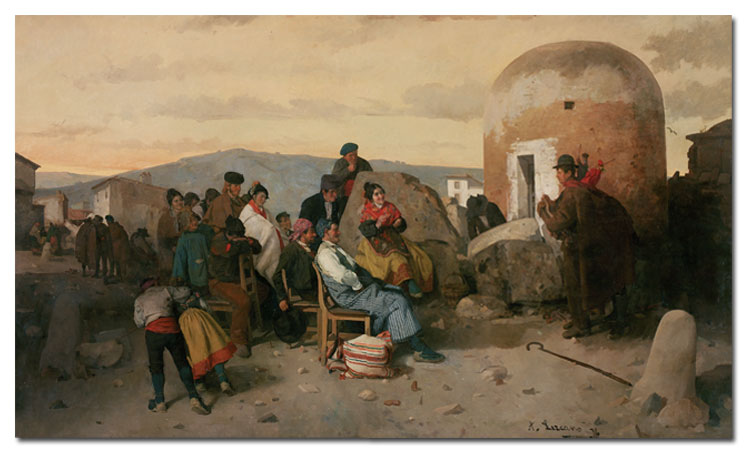
The Puppet Show

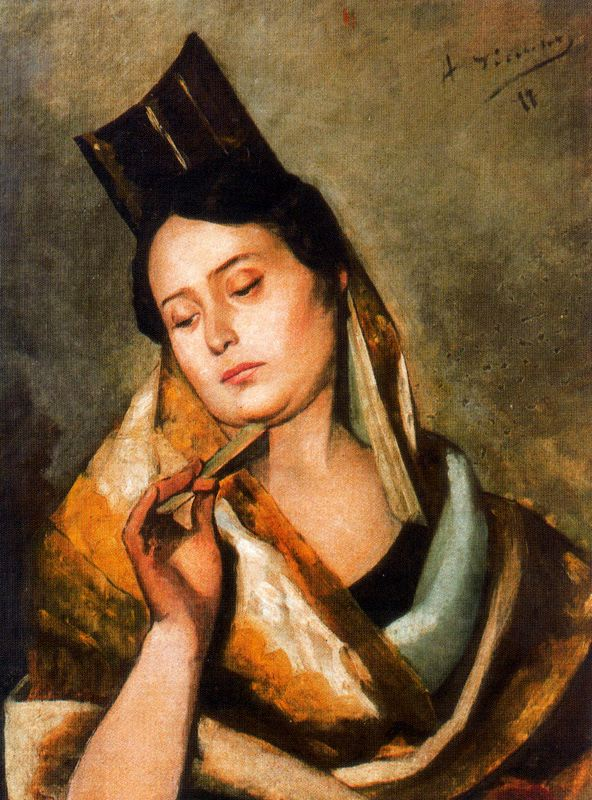
Spanish Lady
