= Sveti Tomaž =

Sveti Tomaž may refer to several places in Slovenia:

- Brecljevo, a settlement in the Municipality of Šmarje pri Jelšah, known as Sveti Tomaž pri Šmarju until 1955
- Municipality of Sveti Tomaž, a municipality in northeastern Slovenia
- Škocjan, Koper, a settlement in the Municipality of Koper, known as Sveti Tomaž until 1955
- Sveti Tomaž, Škofja Loka, a settlement in the Municipality of Škofja Loka
- Sveti Tomaž, Sveti Tomaž, a settlement in the Municipality of Sveti Tomaž
