= Škocjan, Divača =

Škocjan San Canziano della Grotta
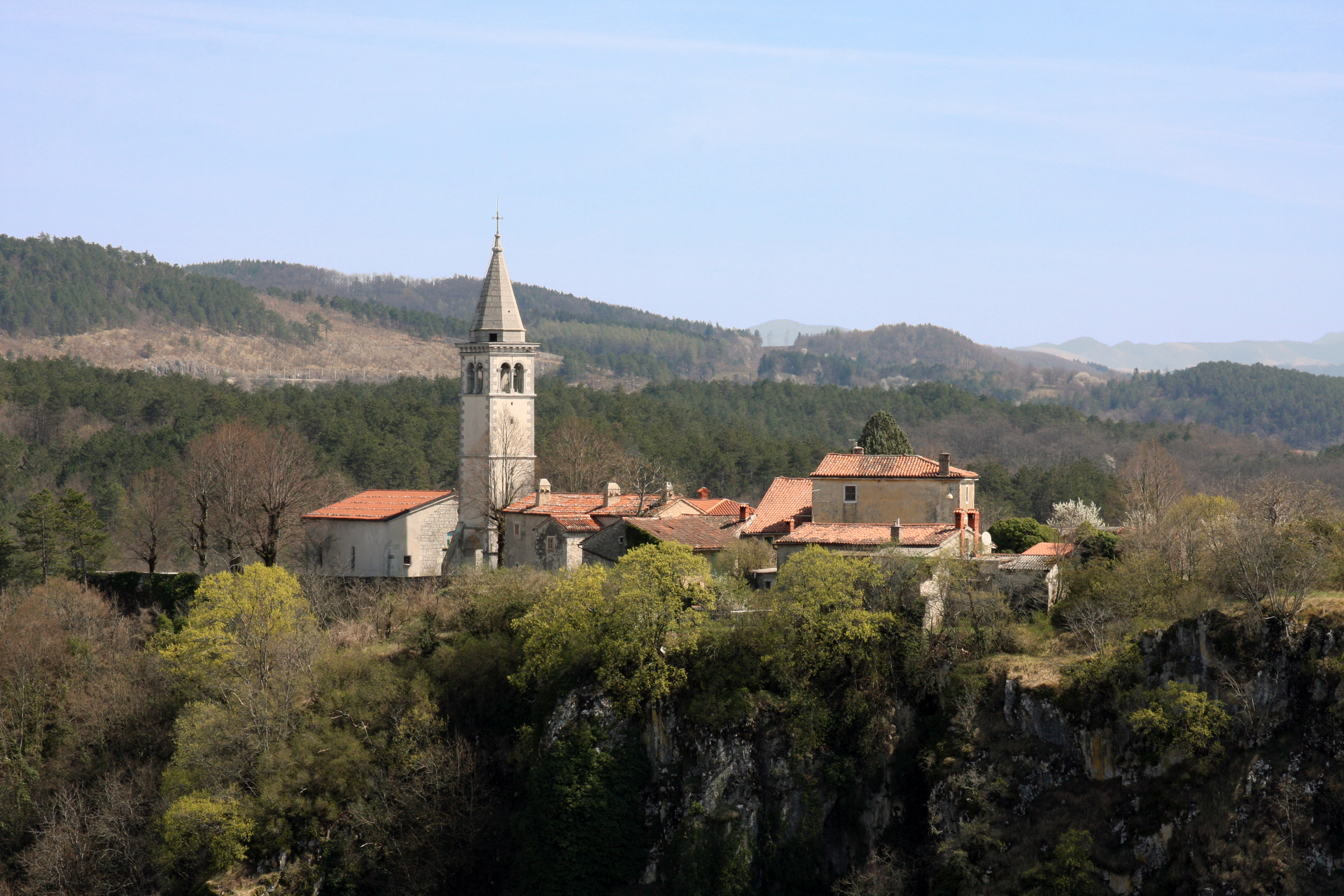

- Location in Slovenia
- Coordinates: 45°39′52.03″N 13°59′36.91″E
- Country: Slovenia
- Traditional region: Littoral
- Statistical region: Coastal–Karst
- Municipality: Divača

Area
  - Total: 0.28 km^{2} (0.11 sq mi)
- Elevation: 423.7 m (1,390 ft)

Population (2020)
  - Total: 7
  - Density: 25/km^{2} (65/sq mi)

Škocjan (pronounced [ˈʃkɔːtsjan]; Italian: San Canziano, San Canziano della Grotta) is a small settlement in the Municipality of Divača in the Littoral region of Slovenia. Nearby Škocjan Caves is named after the village.

The local church is dedicated to Saint Cantianius and belongs to the parish of Rodik.
