= Zayas =

Castilian noble family

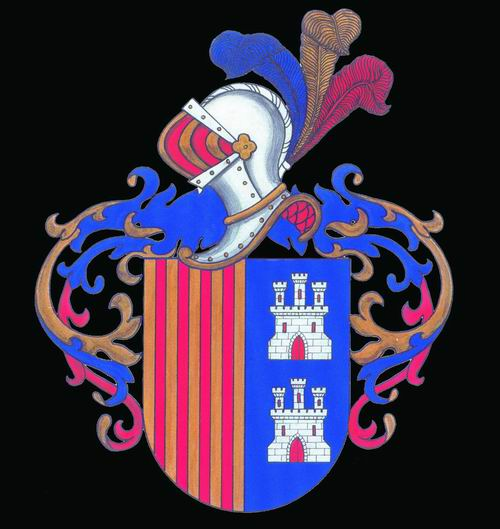
Coat of arms of the old Castilian noble family de Zayas.

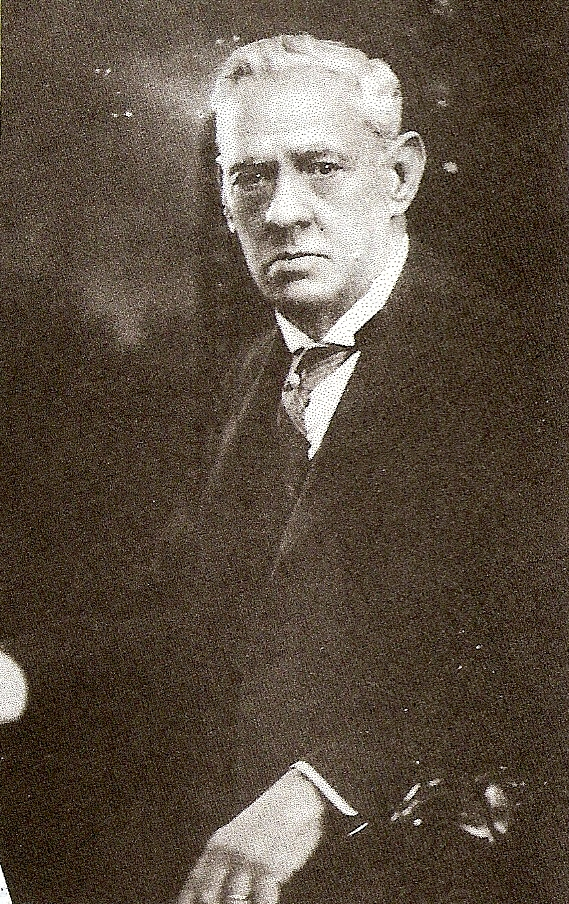
Alfredo Zayas y Alfonso, the 4th President of Cuba

Zayas is an old Castilian noble family, that has its ancestral seat in a place called Zaya in the province of Soria, from where the family took its name. The word Zayas has its origin in the Basque word Zai, meaning watchman or guard.

The novelist María de Zayas belonged to this family. Members of the family also settled in Cuba, where the family owned large sugar plantations and members of the family distinguished themselves in Cuban society as doctors, writers, politicians and diplomats. Alfredo Zayas y Alfonso, a lawyer, poet and politician, served as President of Cuba from 1921 to 1925. He was the son of Dr. José María de Zayas y Jiménez (1824–1887), a noted lawyer and educator, and had two brothers: Dr. Juan Bruno de Zayas y Alfonso (1867–1896), a medical doctor and revolutionary hero who died in the war for Cuba's independence, and Dr. Francisco de Zayas y Alfonso (1857–1924), Cuba's long-time Minister to Paris and Brussels. He also had a illegitimate brother, whose name has been lost to history.

The American legal scholar, historian and UN official Alfred-Maurice de Zayas is a descendant of Alfredo Zayas y Alfonso.
