= Reka (river) =

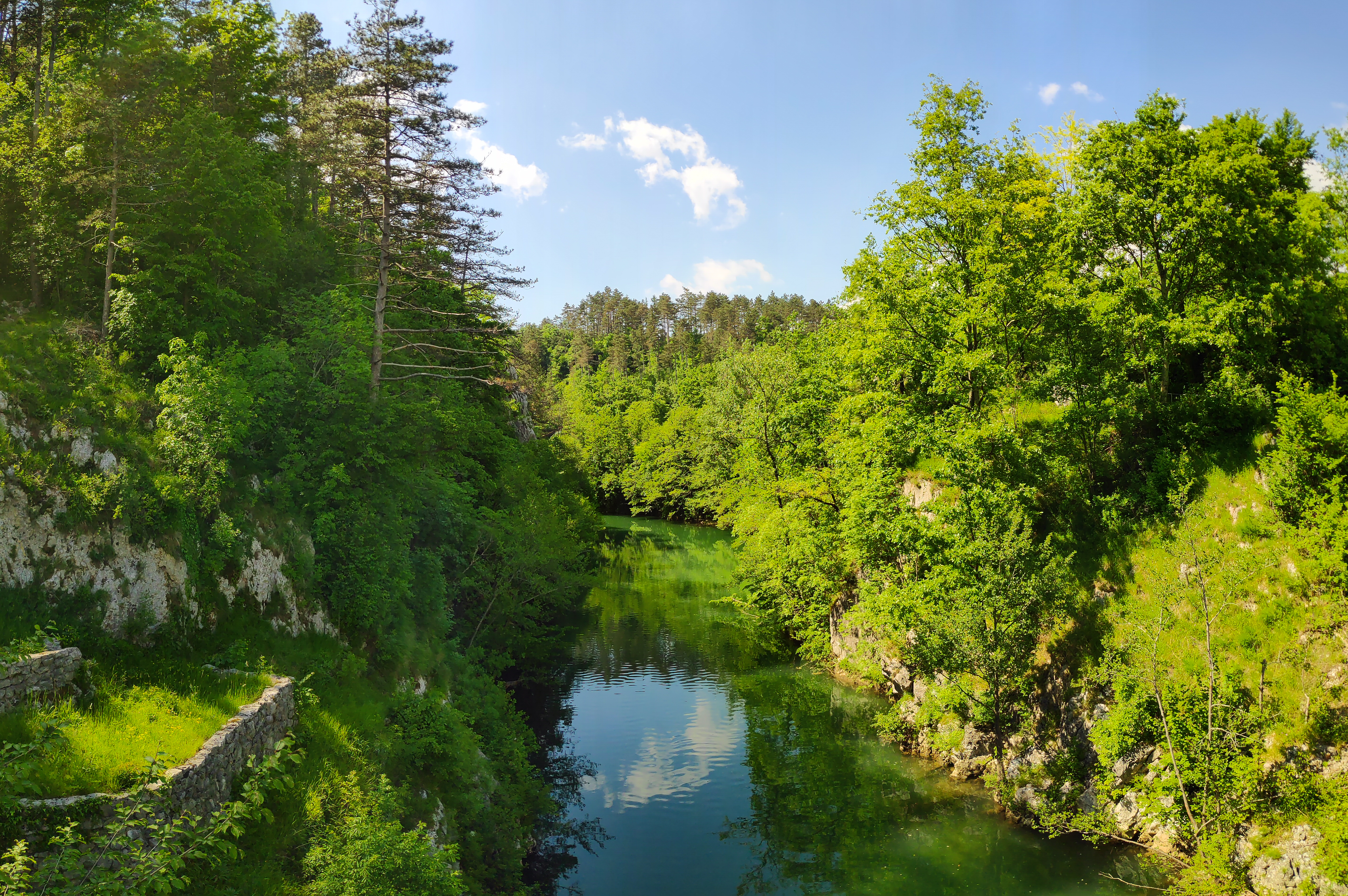
- The Reka at Škoflje

Location
- Countries: Croatia; Slovenia

Physical characteristics
- Mouth
  - location: Škocjan Caves
  - coordinates: 45°39′49″N 13°59′54″E
- Length: 54 km (34 mi)

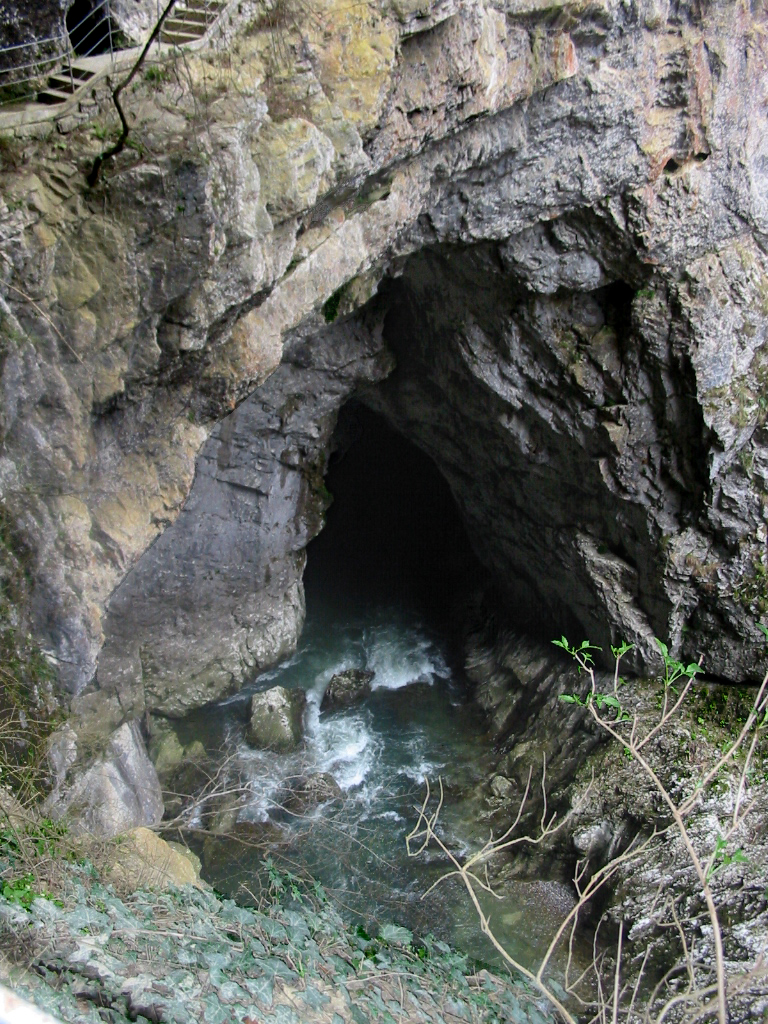
Škocjan Caves ponor

The Reka (literally, 'river' in Slovene), also the Inner Carniola Reka (Slovene: Notranjska Reka), is a river that starts as Big Creek (Croatian: Vela voda) in Croatia, on the southern side of Mount Snežnik, and flows through western Slovenia, where it is also initially known as Big Creek (Velika voda). The river is 54 km (34 mi) long, of which 51 km (32 mi) is in Slovenia. At the village of Škocjan it disappears underground through Škocjan Caves, flowing 38 km (24 mi) underneath the Slovenian Karst. The river continues as part of the Timavo in Italy. Tracer studies have shown that it also feeds springs elsewhere on the Adriatic Coast between Trieste and Monfalcone. It has a pluvial regime.

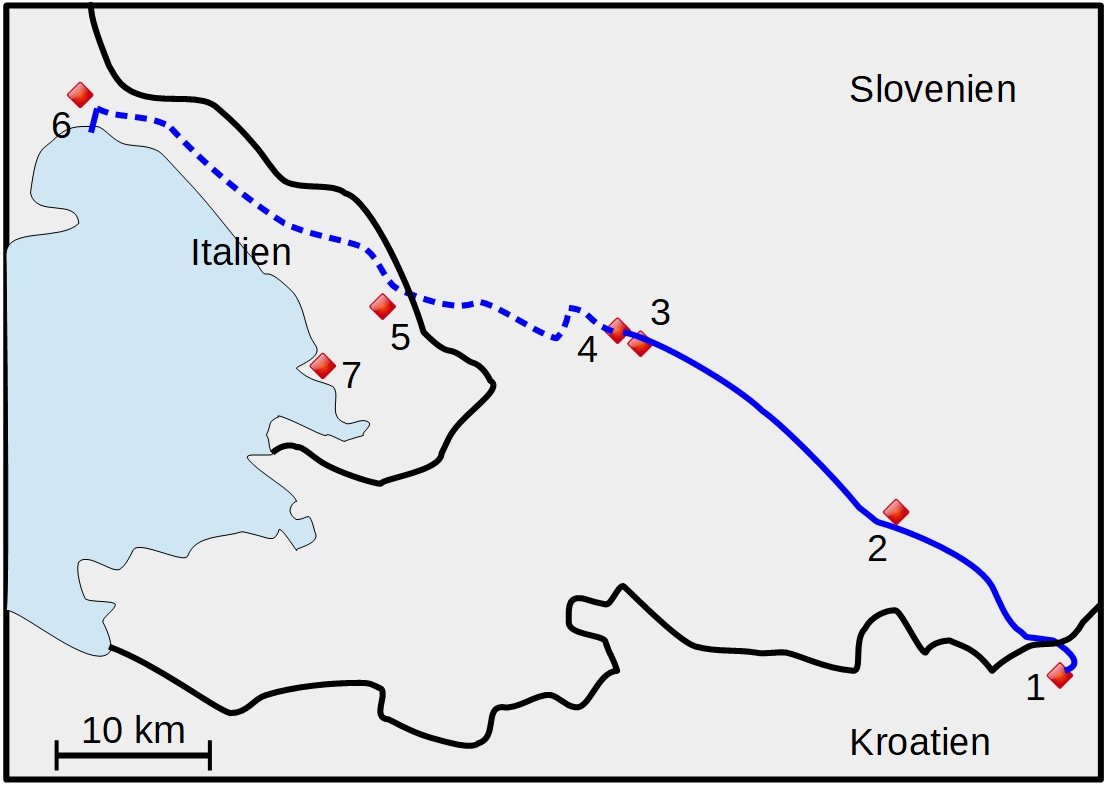
The Reka (solid)-Timavo (dashed) river system of the Karst Plateau. Settlements: Croatia; 1. Vela Voda / Slovenia; 2. Ilirska Bistrica; 3. Vremski Britof; 4. Škocjan / Italy; 5. Trebiciano; 6. Monfalcone; 7. Trieste
