= Eliseo Roberto Colón Zayas =

Puerto Rican cultural theorist

Eliseo Colón
- Born: 12 October 1956 (age 69); San Juan, Puerto Rico
- Education: Duquesne University (BA) and University of Pittsburgh (MA and Ph.D)
- Scientific career
- Fields: Communication, Semiotics, Advertising Discourse, Melodrama and Cultural Studies
- Workplaces: University of Puerto Rico School of Public Communication

Eliseo Roberto Colón Zayas (Puerto Rico, 1956) is a Puerto Rican communication, semiotician, cultural theorist and mass media researcher who specializes in Latin American Mass Media Studies, Semiotics, Cultural Studies, Mass Media Culture, Discourse Analysis, Aesthetics and Advertising Discourse.

== Work ==
Among Zayas’ major works are Matrices culturales del neoliberalismo: Una odisea barroca. [Cultural Matrixes of Neoliberalism: A Barroque Odyssey] Salamanca: Editorial Comunicación Social, 2013; Medios Mixtos: Ensayos de Comunicación y Cultura, [Mix Media: Essays in Culture and Communication] Río Piedras: Editorial Plaza Mayor, 2003; Publicidad y Hegemonía, Matrices Discursivas. [Advertising and Hegemony, Discursive Matrices] Buenos Aires: Editorial Norma, July 2001 (Reprint: November 2001 and May 2003); and, Publicidad, Modernidad, Hegemonía [Advertising, Modernity, Hegemony] Río Piedras: Editorial de la Universidad de Puerto Rico, 1996. In 2000, he published a science fiction novel: Archivo Catalina, Memorias Online. [Catalina Files, Online Memories] Río Piedras: Editorial Plaza Mayor, 2000.

He was inducted as an Honorary Member of the Federación Latinoamericana de Facultades de Comunicación (FELAFACS - Latin American Federation of Communication Colleges) in 2003. In 1988, Eliseo Colón Zayas taught as a Fulbright Lecturer/Research Scholar at the Pontificia Universidade Católica de São Paulo Graduate Department in Communication and Semiotics, São Paulo, Brazil, returning in 1991 as Guest Lecturer. In 2012 and 2013, he was a Visiting Scholar as Erasmus Mundus en étude du spectacle vivant in Spain's University of A Coruña and University of Seville. He has been a guest lecturer at Spain's University of Málaga in 2014-2009 and 2005; University of Seville in 2008 and 2007; Universidad Autónoma de Barcelona- Journalism Department, College of Communication Sciences in 1997. In Latin America, he taught in 2001 at the University of La Plata, Argentina, College of Communication and Journalism; in 2000, at the Instituto de Estudios Superiores de Occidente, ITESO, Guadalajara, Mexico.

Zayas is an active member of the Asociación Latinoamericana de Investigadores de la Comunicación - Latin American Association of Communication Researchers (ALAIC -2009–2014, Director for International Relations; 2002–2004, Regional Director; 1994–2012, Discourse and Communication Discussion Group Coordinator); Asociación Iberoamericana de la Comunicación (IBERCOM -1998-2004 and 2006–2008, Regional Vice President). He serves on the editorial boards of the following academic journals: Pensar la Publicidad. Revista Internacional de Investigaciones Publicitarias, Revista Diálogo de la Comunicación: Revista de la Federación Latinoamericana de Facultades de Comunicación Social, Revista Latinoamericana de Ciencias de la Comunicación: Revista de la Asociación Latinoamericana de Investigadores de la Comunicación, Revista deSignis: Revista de la Asociación Latinoamericana de Semiótica.

== Life ==
Eliseo Colón Zayas was born in San Juan, Puerto Rico. He studied in Hato Rey's Colegio Espíritu Santo. In 1976, he graduated with a degree in Journalism from Duquesne University in Pittsburgh. He also studied Spanish and Latin American literature. In 1982, he finished his PhD at the University of Pittsburgh's Hispanic Languages and Literatures Department. He also holds a Graduate Certificate in Latin American Studies from the same university.

== University career ==
- Puerto Rico, Inter American University and Universidad Central de Bayamón
- University of Puerto Rico's School of Communication:
  - Academic positions: Adjunct professor (1983), Assistant Professor (1985), Associate Professor (1989), tenure (1991).
  - Administrative positions: President of the Academic Senate's Academic Affairs Committee (1996-1998), Coordinator of the School of Communication's Faculty Committee and Academic Senator (1995-1998); Assistant Dean at the Academic Affairs Office (1994-1995); Graduate School Coordinator for the School of Communication (1988-1992), Coordinator of the School of Communication Curriculum Committee (1987-1990) and School of Communication's Research Center (1987-1988).

== Articles in book chapters ==
- “Redes sociales e interacción social cibernética: algunas claves para pensar la socialización del emigrante en Internet” [Social Networks and Social Interaction in Ciberspace: Keys for Understanding Socialization of Immigrants through Internet] in Ingrid Steinbach Méndez, Coord. Comunicación y derechos humanos: procesos de inclusión y exclusión en Iberoamérica. Santa Cruz, Bolivia: Fundación Universidad Privada Santa Cruz de la Sierra, 2012.
- "Del framing a las políticas de identidad: pensar la investigación en comunicación en tiempos de transición económica; El caso de lo latino y la Sociedad del Conocimiento” [From Framing to Identity Politics: Thinking Communication Research in Times of Economic Transition; The Case of Latino Identities and Knowledge Society.] El cambio mediático, Francisco Campos Freire, ed. Sevilla: Comunicación Social Ediciones, 2010.
- “Nuevas sensibilidades y control social: power points y comunidades virtuales” [New Sensibilities and Social Control: Power Points and Virtual Communities.] Construir la sociedad de la comunicación. Juan Antonio García Galindo, Ma. I. Vasallo de Lopes y Ma. T. Vera Balanza. Madrid: Tecnos, 2009.
- "De la comunidad virtual a las redes sociales: jóvenes e interacción social cibernética" [From Virtual Community to Social Networks: Youth and Social Interaction in Ciberspace] en 70 Años de Periodismo y Comunicación en América Latina: Memoria y perspectivas. Alfredo Alfonso, Florencia Saintout y Margarida Krohling Kunsch, eds., La Plata: Universidad Nacional de la Plata Ediciones de Periodismo y Comunicación No. 36, 2007.
- “Matrici discorsive Della pubblicià. Narrativa pubblicitaria e controllo sociale” [Advertising Discourive Matrices: Advertising Narratives and Social Control] In Paolo Bertetti y Carlos Scolari, eds., MediAmerica, Semiotica e analisi dei media in America Latina, Torino, Italia: Cartman Edizioni, 2007. Translated into Spanish in Paolo Bertetti y Carlos Scolari, eds. Ciudad Mediatizada, Mediatización en Latinoamérica, Estudios desde/hacia la semiótica. Buenos Aires: La Crujía, 2011.
- "Panem et Circenses: Terapia Sentimental y Control Social en Tiempos Neoliberales" [Panem et Circenses: Sentimental Therapy and Social Control in Neoliberal Times] In Alejandro Grimson, ed, Cultura y Neoliberalismo, CLACSO: Buenos Aires: 2007.
- “Formación de Comunicadores en Tiempos de Transformación Cultural” [Training Communicators in Times of Cultural Transformation] en Las Profesiones de la Comunicación: Presente y Futuro (pp. 149–150), Noviembre 2006, Portugal: Centro de Publicações do Instituto Superior da Maia.
- “Reforma y Contrarreforma, La universidad finisecular.” [Reform and Counterreform: The university at the end of the Century] Frente a La Torre, Ensayos del Centenario de la Universidad de Puerto Rico, 1903-2003, (Silvia Álvarez Curbelo, Carmen I Rafucci, eds.), San Juan: La Editorial, Universidad de Puerto Rico, 2005, págs. 288–315.
- "Nunca es tarde para quedarme aquí: San Juan y los deleites de una arquitectura para el ocio y la diversión" [Never too late to be here: San Juan and the delights of Architecture for Leisure and Entertainment] en Enrique Vivoni Farague, ed., San Juan siempre nuevo: Arquitectura y modernización en el Siglo XX., San Juan: Archivo de Arquitectura de la Universidad de Puerto Rico, 2000.
- "De los medios a las mediaciones o el devenir de la estética y la historia: diálogo entre Walter Benjamin y Jesús Martín Barbero" [From media to mediations or the evolution of Aesthetics and History: a dialogue between Walter Benjamin and Jesús Martín Barbero] en María Cristina Laverde Toscano y Rossana Reguillo eds. Mapas Nocturnos: Diálogos con la obra de Jesús Martín Barbero, Bogotá: Siglo del Hombre Editores, 1998.
- "Españolidad y sociedad en Puerto Rico: los modos del melodrama / conocerse - reconocerse" [Spanishness and Society in Puerto Rico: The Modes of Melodrama / To be known – To be recognized] en Hispanofilia: Arquitectura en Puerto Rico: 1900 - 1950. Silvia Álvarez y Enrique Vivoni, eds. Río Piedras: Editorial Universitaria, 1998.
- "Desmaio de uma lágrima:nostalgia, simulacro e melodrama a partir do bolero"[Soft Tears: Simulacra and Melodrama in bolero] en Comunicacião na era pós-moderna. Mônica Rector y Eduardo Neiva, orgs. Rio de Janeiro: Editora Vozes, 1997.
- "Looking for Mr. Blades: el efecto estético Rubén Blades" [Looking for Mr. Blades: the Ruben Blades Aesthetic Effect] en Irma Rivera Nieves y Carlos Gil, eds. Polifonía Salvaje: Ensayos de Cultura y Política en la postmodernidad. Editorial Postdata: San Juan, 1995.
- "Expo 92 y la construcción de la historia: fragmentos para una crónica de verano" [Expo 92 and the Construction of History: Fragments of a Summer Chronicle.] en Post-Data no. 5, 1992. También en Irma Rivera Nieves y Carlos Gil, eds., Polifonía Salvaje: Ensayos de Cultura y Política en la postmodernidad. Editorial Postdata: San Juan, 1995.
- "Selva Deleitosa: sexualidades y usos de la comunicación" [Delicious Forest: Sexuality and Communication Research en Investigar la Comunicación: Propuestas Iberoamericanas. Cecilia Cervantes Barba y Enrique Sánchez Ruiz, eds. Guadalajara: Universidad de Guadalajara, Centro de Estudios de la Información y la Comunicación, 1994.

== Editor of publications ==
- Gusto Latino, “¿Pensar lo latino?, Bitácora para una presentación” [Thinking the notion of Latino, Guide for a Presentation] Número monográfico deSignis (14), 2009, editor, Buenos Aires: Editorial La Crujía.
- Revista Iberomericana, Número especial sobre Literatura Puertorriqueña, [Special Edition on Puerto Rican Literature] 162–163, editor 1993.

== Articles ==
- “Walter Mercado: estrella del performance camp y queer” [Walter Mercado: Star of the queer and camp performance]. deSignis (19) 2012
- “Terapia Sentimental y control social en tiempos neoliberales: las narrativas Power Point y las comunidades virtuales” [Sentimental Therapy and Social Control in Neoliberal Times: Power Point Narratives and Virtual Communities] en Conexiones: Revista Iberoamericana de Comunicación (2) 2009.
- “San Juan de Puerto Rico y los deleites de la carnavalización domesticada.” [San Juan, Puerto Rico and the Delights of a domesticated carnavalization] en deSignis (13) 2009.
- Seguridad ontológica, construcción del yo biográfico y narrativas televisivas. [Ontological Security and the Construction of the Self in Television Biographical Narratives] en deSignis. (7-8), 2005, págs. 125–133.
- “Mapas de la narrativa televisiva en Latinoamérica: un diálogo de Eliseo Colón con María Immacolata Vasallo de Lopes” [Mapping Television Narratives in Latin America: Dialogue between Eliseo Colón and María Immacolata Vasallo de Lopes] en deSignis. (7-8), 2005, págs 191–199.
- “De la plantación de aldea a la plantación global”. [From Plantation Village to Global Village] en Telos Cuadernos de Comunicación, Tecnología y Sociedad, no 61 octubre-diciembre 2004.
- “Las tramas de la emoción.” [Patterns of Emotion] Jóvenes, Revista de Estudios sobre la juventud, año 8, núm 20, enero- junio 2004.
- “Imagen discográfica e identidades: el caso de Lucecita Benítez.” [Recording Label and Identities: the case of Lucecita Benitez.] en Animus. vol. II, no. 2, 2003.
- “Comunicar para la paz: la guerra y los comunicadores.” [Communicating for Peace: War and Journalists] en Telos Cuadernos de Comunicación, Tecnología y Sociedad, no. 55, abril-junio 2003.
- “Melodrama, censura y travestismo cultural.” [Melodrama, Censorship and Cultural Travestism] en Diálogos de la Comunicación no. 65, noviembre 2002.
- “Los medios norteamericanos y el atentado contra las Torres Gemelas, El grado cero de la información.” [The U.S. Media and the attack on the Twin Towers: Zero degree of Information] en Trampas de la comunicación y la cultura, no.6 octubre 2002.
- “Las trampas del saber: Investigación y Cultura Popular en tiempos neoliberales.” [Knowledge Traps: Research and Popular Culture in Neoliberal Times] Trampas de la comunicación y la cultura, no.1 abril/mayo 2002.
- “…pared blanca, teja antañona, ladrillo rojo, persiana verde…: Ciudad Universitaria de Río Piedras – Espacio – Espectáculo – Utopía.” [... white wall, old tile, red brick, green shutters ...: Rio Piedras’ University City: Space - Entertainment – Utopia] Postdata no. 16, noviembre 2001.
- "Pensar las discursividades: Sociedad de la Información y sus nuevas redes discursivas, el caso de la neotelevisión y sus prácticas simbólicas". [Thinking Discourse: Information Society and its new discursive network, the case of neotelevision and its symbolic practices] Diálogos de la Comunicación, nos. 59–60, octubre 2000. Also in, Juglares y Alarifes, no.22, diciembre 2001.
- "La semiótica en Puerto Rico." [Semiotics in Puerto Rico] en Signa, Revista de la Asociación Española de Semiótica. no. 7, 1998.
- "Arte ostentando los primores es cauteloso engaño del sentido...Representaciones identitarias de géneros y sexualidades." [Art displaying all the charms is a subtle deception of the senses: Identity Representations of gender and sexualities] en Nómadas. Revista de la Universidad Central de Bogotá. no. 6, Marzo 1997.
- "Archivos sobre el saber: directorios del Total Quality Management". [Knowledge Files: Total Quality Management Directories] en Renglones. Revista del Iteso, Guadalajara, México, no. 36, diciembre 1996.
- "Sobre: Juan Gelpí, Literatura y paternalismo en Puerto Rico. [On Juan Gelpi’s Literature and Paternalism in Puerto Rico] en Revista Iberoamericana. No. 174, enero - marzo 1996.
- "Desmayo de una lágrima: nostalgia, simulacro y melodrama desde el bolero". "[Soft Tears: Simulacra and Melodrama in bolero] en Cuadernos del Lazarillo: Revista Literaria y cultural. Salamanca, España, no.7, Enero 1995.
- "Archivos sobre el saber: Directorios del TQM" [Knowledge Files: TQM Directories]en Postdata. no. 10, 1995.
- "Arte / Estética / Efecto. [Art, Aesthetic, Effect] en Diálogos de la Comunicación, Revista de la Federación Latinoamericana de Facultades de Comunicación Social, no. 40, 1994.
- "Los nombres del amor: reconocer, convocar y evocar el melodrama". [The Names of Love: Recognition, Calling and Recalling in Melodrama] en Renglones del ITESO. no. 27. 1993. También en Irma Rivera Nieves y Carlos Gil, eds., Polifonía Salvaje: Ensayos de Cultura y Política en la postmodernidad. Editorial Postdata: San Juan, 1995.
- "Nombres de pasión y melodrama." [Names of Passion and Melodrama] Postdata. no. 8, 1993.
- "Arte y Postmodernidad: el caso de Walter Benjamin."[Art and Postmodernity: The Case of Walter Benjamin] Revista Liga de Arte. no. 21, 1993.
- "La hora del cuerpo: recepción y consumo de la comedia en Puerto Rico". [Timely Bodies: Comedy Reception in Puerto Rico] Diálogos de la Comunicación, Revista Teórica de la Federación Latinoamericana de Asociaciones de Facultades de Comunicación Social. No. 30, Junio de 1991. págs. 64–75.
- "Las telenovelas en Puerto Rico durante la década de los ochenta". [Telenovelas in Puerto Rico during the Eighties] Corto Circuito. Revista Trimestral de Comunicación y Culturas Latinas. No. 15, Abril de 1991. págs. 24–27.
- "Pragmática de la imagen fija en la publicidad: Estructura del Discurso Publicitario". [Pragmatics of the Still Image in Advertising: Structure of Advertising Discourse] Diálogos de la Comunicación. Revista Teórica de la Federación Latinoamericana de Asociaciones de Facultades de Comunicación Social. No.27, Julio de 1990. págs 63 - 70.
- "Memoria - Producción Testimonial - Medios de Comunicación: Apuntes para su estudio". [Memory - Production - Testimonials – Mass Media: Notes for consideration] Diálogos, Cuadernos, No. 1 Junio de 1990.
- "La imagen fija en la publicidad",[The still image in advertising] Face, Revista de Comunicación y Semiótica (São Paulo) vol. 1, no. 2 1989.
- "Estructura del Discurso publicitario: un acercamiento a la publicidad puertorriqueña". [Advertising Discourse Structure: An Approach to Puerto RicanAdvertising] Hispanística XX, 5 1987.
- "En breve cárcel de Sylvia Molloy o los malabarismos de la seducción" [En breve cárcel: Sylvia Molloy or the Juggling of Seduction] Revista La Torre, 2 (1987).
- "La narración como forma del proceso cognoscitivo en Felices días, tío Sergio de Magali García Ramis." [Narration as a form of cognitive process in Magali García Ramis’ Felices días, tío Sergio] Revista La Torre, 1 (1987).
- "La escritura ante la formación de la conciencia nacional: La peregrinación de Bayoán de Eugenio María de Hostos."[Writing and the formation of national consciousness: Eugenio María de Hostos’ La peregrinación de Bayoán] Revista Iberoamericana, 140-141 (1987).
