= Vital Aza =

Spanish writer (1851–1912)

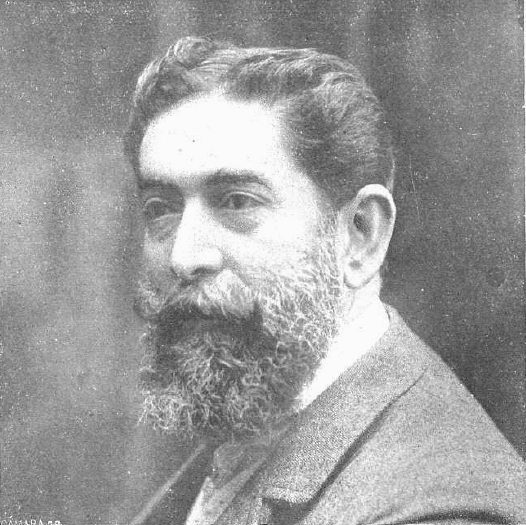
Vital Aza Photograph by Kaulak

Vital Aza Álvarez-Buylla (25 April 1851 – 13 December 1912) was a Spanish author, playwright, poet and satirist, born in Pola de Lena, Asturias, northwestern Spain. After studying and practicing medicine, he began to write plays, some with Miguel Ramos Carrión. His first, Basta de matemáticas, which premiered at the Variedades in 1874, was highly successful and was followed by more than 70 other plays. The centenary of his birth was celebrated by Aguilar's publication of an anthology of Aza's best plays in the Colección Crisol (1951).
