= Tomaž Ocvirk =

Slovenian handball coach

Tomaž Ocvirk is a Slovenian handball coach for RK Celje.

== See also ==
- European Handball Federation
- Sport in Slovenia
