= Tomás Luceño =

Spanish poet and playwright

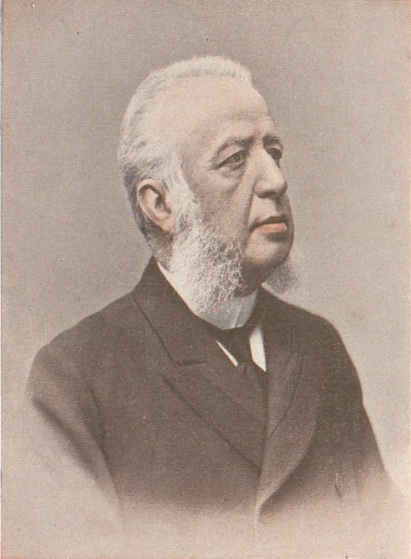
- Born: 21 December 1844; Madrid (España)
- Died: 27 January 1933 (aged 88); Madrid
- Occupations: Playwright and poet

Tomás Luceño y Becerra (21 December 1844 – 27 January 1933) was a Spanish poet and playwright.

== Biography ==
He was the son of the first instance judge Manuel Luceño and Juana Becerra, both born in Cáceres . Although he started studying engineering, he left it for law studies, in which he graduated. When he worked as a clerk in the Interior Ministry, the Revolution of 1868 left him unemployed. He did not like the monarchical Restoration at all because he was a republican. In 1871 he entered by opposition as editor of the Senate Sessions Journal, where he became chief stenographer and chief editor until his retirement in 1911. There are numerous anecdotes about him in this position . Once Minister López de Ayala introduced Luceño to a lady in the following way:

—Here you have my friend Luceño, the man who has written the most nonsense in this world.
"Are you a writer?" the lady asked.
To which Luceño responded:
-No ma'am; I am a stenographer.

He worked for the Minister of the Interior and protector of Bécquer, Luis González Bravo; He was private secretary of the Duke of La Torre in the Ministry of Overseas and of the playwright minister Adelardo López de Ayala until 1879, as well as of the six ministers who succeeded him. He married a native of Tarazona de la Mancha, with whom he had no children. He spent several summers in that town and has a dedicated street there. On two occasions he was part of the Board of Directors of the Society of Authors, established on June 16, 1899 and of which he was one of its first associates. As a comedian he collaborated in the writing of La historia comica de España . On June 20, 1910 he donated a significant number of works to the Municipal Library of Madrid . He died on January 27, 1933 at the age of eighty-eight in his home on Cuesta de Santo Domingo, in Madrid, and is buried in the Sacramental de San Isidro.

== Work ==
Apart from being a comedian, he also stood out as a prolific author of articles on customs in the weekly Blanco y Negro under the heading "Mi teatrillo". He specialized in sainete, a genre of which he was the king in his time along with Ricardo de la Vega and Javier de Burgos, and he is considered the successor of Ramón de la Cruz for his classicism and Madridism . He composed about twenty; He also shone in the boy genre, in whose Madrid dramatic variant he shone with pieces such as the aforementioned Cuadros al fresco (1870), his first piece and with which he came to the fore when it was premiered with great success by the company of the prestigious Emilio Mario. in January 1870 at the Lope de Rueda Theater; Today it comes out, today...! (1884), in collaboration with Javier de Burgos and with certain shades of sociopolitical criticism; A Sunday at the Rastro, El corral de comedias, El Imparcial's Mondays, Bateo, bateo!, The portals of the palza, The tobacconist's girl, A living uncle, Long live the deceased!, The famous comedienne, The master of doing skits or The buggies, How many, warm, how many?, Fraile fingido, La noche de "El Trovador", El arte por las cielos and the magazine Fiesta nacional, among many others. He made recasts of classical Spanish theater (Calderón, Rojas Zorrilla, Lope de Vega etc.) within the collection La Novela Teatral (1916-1925).

Jacinto Octavio Picón praised his extraordinary wit and grace, which contrasted quite a bit with his serious and distinguished demeanor:

No matter how much wit those around him have, he always says what no one else can think of, taking advantage of both human weaknesses and imperfections or irregularities of the language, with such rare originality that his phrases then spread from word to mouth. mouth, taking his own right to become a citizen in the picturesque language used by people behind the scenes. He speaks little, he does not murmur or curse anyone, his censures do not hurt, his mockery does not hurt, his criticism does not mortify, and he says whatever he wants, without his sayings taking on that bitter aftertaste that in other men seems like a vapor of removed bad passions.

He had a knack for writing humorous and anecdotal verses, which he published in newspapers and magazines of the time and compiled in two books. He was a great observer of human types: people who get up early or stay up late in fresco paintings; fearful and scoundrels who want to get rid of villas, in Judgment of exemptions; shopkeepers with little money and customers with less money, in Ultramarinos; Lottery and bullfighting fans, in Hoy it comes out, today! and National holiday; sycophants and political asslickers in Amen! or The illustrious sick man; café comedians in The Modern Theater and A Chick Dog; cheaters and cheesy in Carranza y Compañía, the turncoats in Las recommendations; the liberals and anarchists in An Uncle Who Brings It Up and those passionate about flamenco and partying in Los Mondays by El Imparcial . However, he does not relate these types to each other as interpreters of a networked action, unlike, for example, his contemporary and also sainetista Ricardo de la Vega, who had greater success.

Conservative liberal respectful of religion, he tried to educate his public in the reformist ideals of Regenerationism and Krausism . Thus, for example, in A Guy Who Brings It Up, one of the protagonists says:

Civilization is not this... / It is constant work, / the union of humanity / in fraternal bonds; / the factory, the development / of sciences and arts; / and it is, finally, marching / always looking forward, / that only with progress / people can be great.

== Author's bibliography ==
- Selected Theatre, Madrid, Widow of Hernando y Compañía, 1894.

=== Narrative ===
- "The invasion of the Arabs and the emirate", in Comic History of Spain, Madrid, Imprenta Hijos de MG Hernández, 1911.

=== Verses ===
- Romances and other excesses (Barcelona, Spanish Bookstore, 1889)

=== Memories ===
- Memories... to the family (Madrid, Administration of the Madrid Newscast-Guide, 1905)

=== Sainetes ===
- Fresco paintings (1870)
- Today it comes out, today...! (1884), in collaboration with Javier de Burgos
- A Sunday at the Rastro
- The comedy corral
- Mondays of El Imparcial
- Bat, bat!
- The portals of the square
- The tobacconist's girl
- a living guy
- Long live the deceased!
- The famous comedian
- The master of making sainetes or Los calesines
- How many, warm, how many?
- pretend friar
- The night of "The Troubadour"
- Art through the clouds
- National holiday, magazine, with Javier de Burgos
- A small dog!
- Flatter and you will win or The Horse of Ferdinand VII
- Amen! or The illustrious sick man
- Carranza and Company
- The modern theater
- The Recommendations
- Mondays of "El Imparcial"
- Groceries
- A trial of exemptions
- A guy who brings them

=== Zarzuelas ===
- Don Lucas del Cigarral, recast of the comedy by Francisco de Rojas: Between Bobos anda el Juego, premiered at the Parish Theater on 2-18-1899.
- To study Salamanca, zarzuela in one act, with music by José M.ª Güervos and Vives Roig, premiered at the Teatro Apolo on May 10, 1901.
- El Progreso Evolutivo or Comestibles Finos zarzuela, with music by Roberto Jiménez Ortells, premiered at the Apolo on May 1, 912.
- The best mayor, the zarzuela king by T. Luceño and E. Sierra, with music by Amadeo Vives .
- A living guy (unlocated).

=== Comedies ===
- Master and servant, recast by Francisco de Rojas Zorrilla, Where there are grievances there is no jealousy, and master and servant . Luceño recast it in four acts and it was premiered at the Teatro Español on 3-6-1911.
- Don Gil de las Calzas Verdes, recast of the homonymous comedy by Tirso de Molina, premiered at the Teatro de la Comedia on 10-4-1902.
- The husbands exam or Before you get married, look at what you do, recast of the comedy of the same name Juan Ruiz de Alarcón .
- The impossible greatest comedy in verse, two days, preceded by a prologue, in imitation of an ancient play, premiered at the Teatro de la Princesa on 4-7-1926.
- El licensed Vidriera, comedy in three acts, original by Agustín Moreto, premiered at the Teatro de la Princesa in 1923, inspired by the exemplary novel by Cervantes .
- The woman or The curious impertinent is made of glass, inspired by Cervantes' novel, versed and adapted to the stage.
- The Beautiful Ugly, recast of the comedy in four acts, original by Lope de Vega, premiered at the Teatro Español in 1923.
- La moza del cántaro, recast of the comedy in three acts by Lope de Vega, premiered at the Teatro Español on 3-8-1902.
- Lances de amo, lyrical comedy in two acts and in verse, recast of which, with the title Where there are grievances there is no jealousy and Master and servant, Francisco de Rojas Zorrilla wrote; music by Rafael Calleja . It was premiered at the Comic Theater on 11-7-1912.
- Her Majesty's Fan, recast of Lady Windermere's Fan by Oscar Wilde, premiered at the Calderón Theater on 6-23-1930.
- Preciosilla que paso, sainete in one act and in verse, written about the thought of La Gitanilla de Cervantes. In the edition of The famous comedienne (R. Velasco, Madrid, 1908, p. 35), the titles of two other recast works appear: La discrete enamorada, based on the work of Lope de Vega, and Los Tellos de Meneses .

=== Tragedies ===
- A secret grievance, secret revenge, recast of the play of the same title by Pedro Calderón de la Barca, premiered at the Teatro Español in 1912.
- The greatest monster, jealousy, recast inspired by the work of Pedro Calderón de la Barca

== Bibliography ==
- Fernando Collada, "Introduction" to ¡Amen! or The illustrious sick man, Madrid: Ediciones del Orto, Collection "La Cuarta de Apolo", 2010.
- Javier Huerta, Emilio Peral, Héctor Urzaiz, Spanish Theater from A to Z, Madrid: Espasa-Calpe, 2005.
- Jacinto Octavio Picón, "Study" in Tomás Luceño, Teatro Echos, Madrid: Viuda de Hernando, 1894.
