= Tomás Rafael Rodríguez Zayas =

Tomás Rafael Rodríguez Zayas (26 April 1949, in Holguín – 6 September 2010, in Holguín) was a self-taught Cuban artist specializing in humoristic drawing, engraving, and illustration.

== Individual exhibitions ==
Zayas held numerous solo exhibitions including "Tomy. 1a Exposición Personal [grabados]", Teatro Nacional de Cuba, Havana, Cuba, in 1980. In 1996 he showed his work in the "El que inventó la trampa hizo la ley" exhibition within Cuba, and in 2001 he exhibited "Primera exposición personal del Tercer milenio" in the XII Humoristic Biennial, San Antonio de los Baños.

== Collective exhibitions ==
In 1975 and 1977 he was included in the "El mundo existe porque ríe" Bullgary. He also participated in II Humoristic Biennial at Círculo de Artesanos, San Antonio de los Baños, Havana, Cuba, 1981. In 1993 he was one of the selected artists for the "La Pistola" II Bienal Internacional de Caricatura José Guadalupe Posada. Sociedad Mexicana de Caricaturistas, México D.F., Mexico, and in 2001 his drawings were selected for the Bienal de Bahía, Bahía, Brazil.

== Awards ==
In 1970 he was awarded Second Prize for General Humor. I National Humoristic Saloon, Galería La Rampa, Hotel Habana Libre, Havana, Cuba.

In 1999 he was awarded the Prize for Politic Humor. Salón de la Prensa, Porto Alegre, Brazil, and in 2000 First Prize in Humoristic Graphic encounter, Santa Cruz de Tenerife, Islas Canarias, Spain.

== References and external links ==
- Jose Veigas-Zamora, Cristina Vives Gutierrez, Adolfo V. Nodal, Valia Garzon, Dannys Montes de Oca; Memoria: Cuban Art of the 20th Century; (California/International Arts Foundation 2001); ISBN 978-0-917571-11-4
- Jose Viegas; Memoria: Artes Visuales Cubanas Del Siglo Xx; (California Intl Arts 2004); ISBN 978-0-917571-12-1
