= Timavo =

River in Italy

Coordinates: 45.794°N 13.58°E

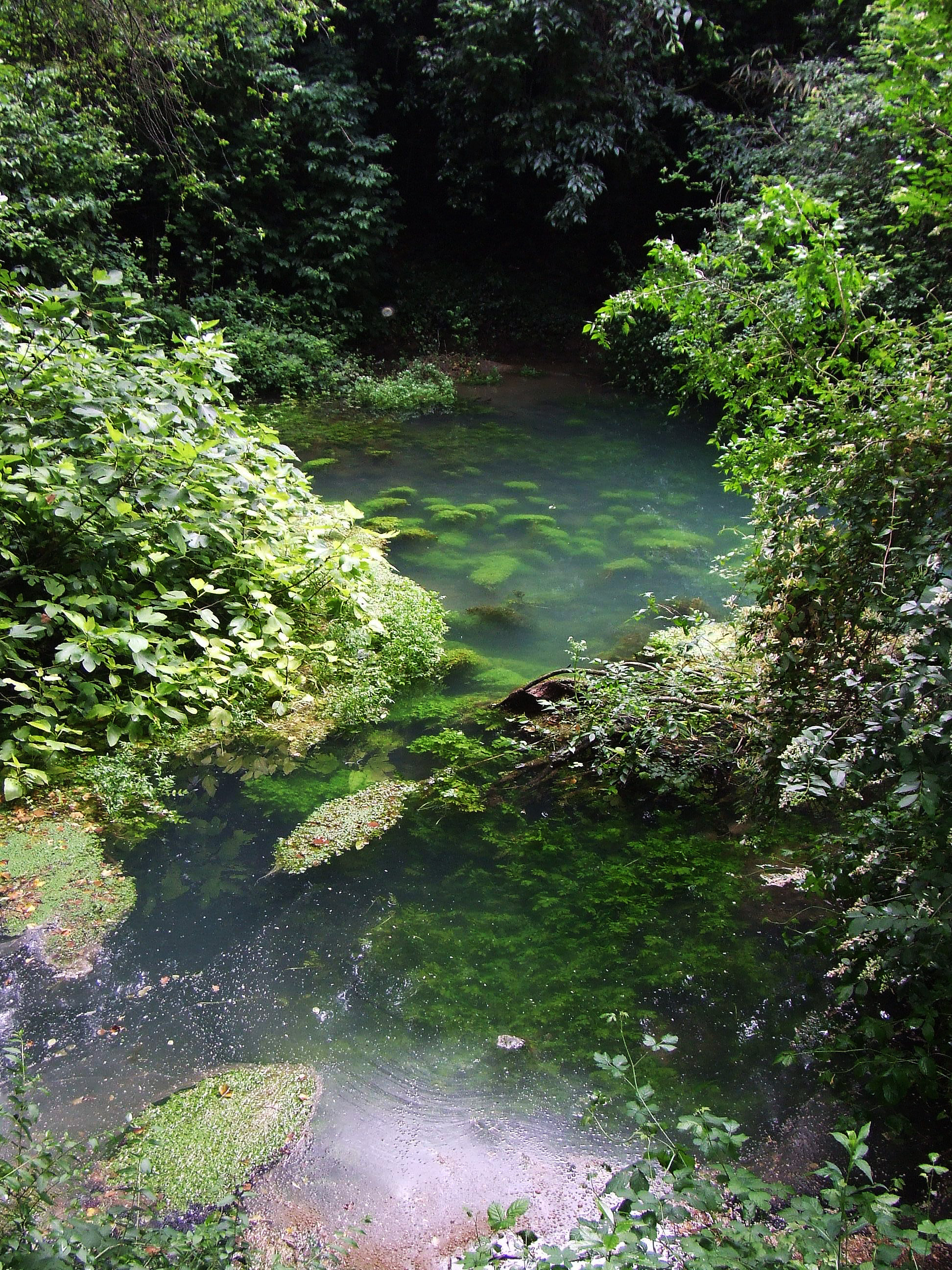
The source of the Timavo in San Giovanni di Duino

The Timavo River, known in Slovene as the Timava or Timav, is a two-kilometre stream in the Province of Trieste. It has four sources near San Giovanni (Slovene: Štivan) near Duino (Slovene: Devin) and outflows in the Gulf of Panzano (part of the Gulf of Trieste) 3 kilometres (2 mi) southeast of Monfalcone (Slovene: Tržič), Italy.

== Geography ==
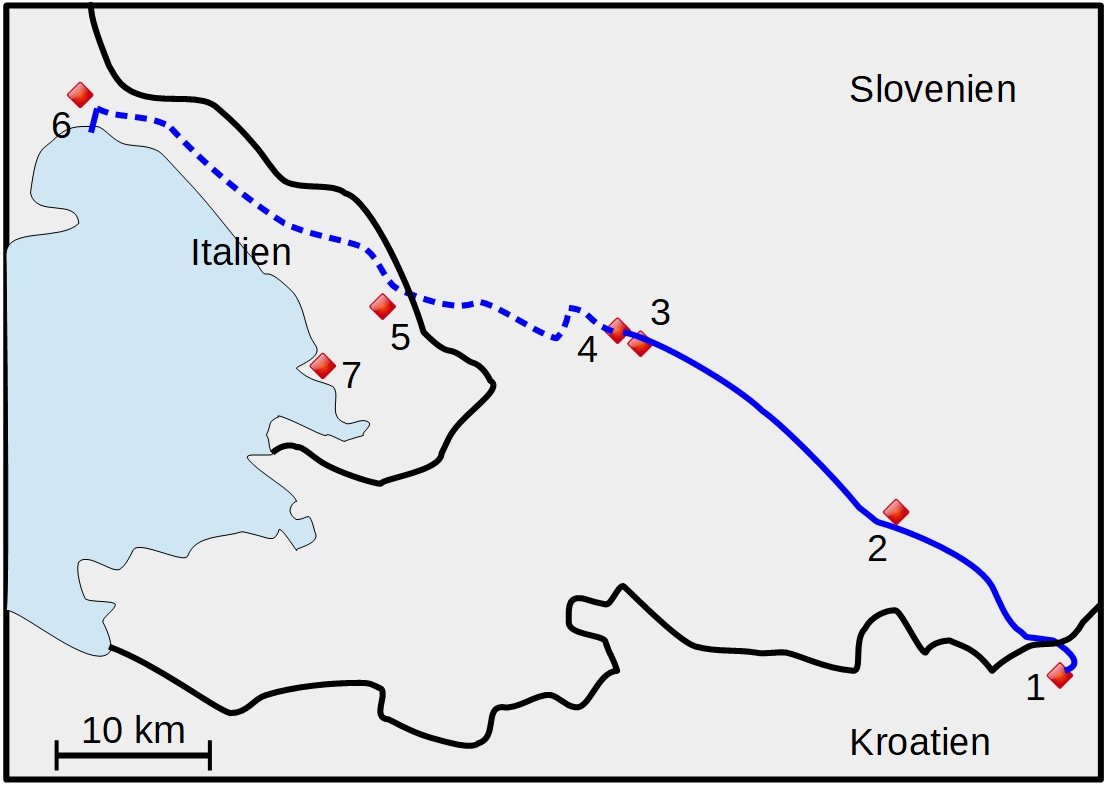
The Reka (solid)-Timavo (dashed) river system of the Croatian, Slovenian, and Italian Karst. Settlements: Croatia; 1. Vela Voda / Slovenia; 2. Ilirska Bistrica; 3. Vremski Britof; 4. Škocjan / Italy; 5. Trebiciano; 6. Monfalcone; 7. Trieste

The river has a karst character. It receives much of its water through subterranean flow from the Reka River (Slovenia), but tracer studies have shown that other sinking rivers, Vipava, Soča, and Raša also contribute. From modelling results, the Timavo is believed to receive one third of its flow from the Reka and two-thirds of its flow from infiltration of precipitation into the Karst Plateau, and to a lesser extent from the other sinking river sources.

== History ==
The Roman authors Livy, Strabo, and Virgil mention the river. Virgil wrote that nine streams emerge from a mountain to form the river. A Roman settlement near the sources was called Fons Timavi. An Italian passenger liner called the Timavo ran aground during the Second World War on the east coast of South Africa near Cape Vidal. The engine of the wreck is still visible from the beach, now situated within the Isimangaliso Wetland Park.

== Literature ==
In his 2019 work Underland, British author Robert Macfarlane tracks the source of the Timavo and discusses the history of its exploration.
