= María de Zayas =

Spanish writer (c. 1590 - 1661)

- Born: c. 12 September 1590; Madrid, Spain
- Writing career
- Period: Spanish Golden Age
- Genres: Literary Feminism; Women's Writing; Novellas
- Movement: Baroque

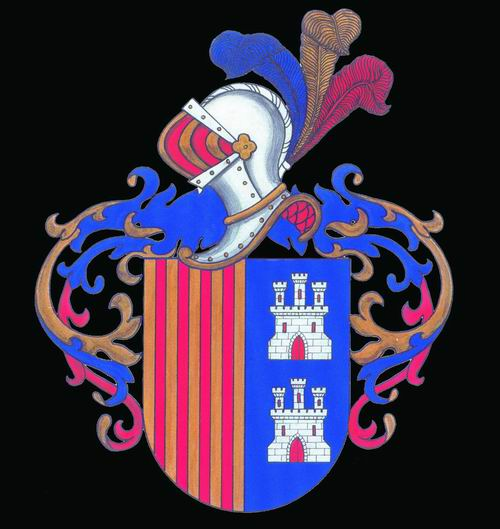
Coat of arms of the old Castilian noble family de Zayas.

María de Zayas y Sotomayor (born c. 12 September 1590) was a writer during the Spanish Golden Age. She is considered by many modern critics to be one of the pioneers of feminist literature, while others evaluate her within the context of Baroque literature. Her stories frequently depict the social challenges faced by women in 17th-century Spain.

== Biography ==
Born in Madrid, de Zayas was the daughter of infantry captain Fernando de Zayas y Sotomayor and María Catalina de Barrasa. Her baptism was known to have taken place in the church of San Sebastian on 12 September 1590, and given the fact that most of Spain's well-to-do families baptized their infants days after birth, it may be deduced that de Zayas was born days before this date. Little is known with any certainty about her life. We do not know whether she was single or married or whether she spent part of her life in Naples or not. In 1637, de Zayas published her first collection of novellas, Novelas amorosas y ejemplares (The Enchantments of Love) in Zaragoza, and ten years later, her second collection, Desengaños amorosos (The Disenchantments of Love), was published. De Zayas also wrote a play, La traicion en la amistad, (Friendship Betrayed) as well as poetry. The author enjoyed the respect and admiration of some of the best male writers of her day. Among her many admirers were Lope de Vega, who dedicated some of his poetry to her, and Alonso de Castillo Solórzano, who named her the "Sibila de Madrid" (Sibyl of Madrid). Despite the enduring popularity of her works during the 17th and 18th centuries, the 19th century saw a decline in the popularity of her work with some critics deeming it to be vulgar. Her novellas faded into relative obscurity until they were 'rediscovered' in the late 20th century. After the publication of her last collection of novellas in 1647, she disappears from the records and it is not known for sure when she died. Various death certificates bearing the name María de Zayas have been found. In the introduction to a recent publication of La traición en la amistad Alberto Rodríguez de Ramos makes a convincing case that the María de Zayas whose death was recorded in 1661 is the author of the play and the novellas. If this is true, the author lived in Valladolid between 1631 and 1633 and was married to Juan de Valdés. This identification strengthens the links with convent of the Concepción Jerónima as well as Inés de Casamayor and the son of the Duke of Híjar, to whom the Desengaños amorosos are dedicated. It also implies that Zayas was employed by Margareta de Ulloa, the marquesa de Malagón, before her affiliation with the Duchess of Lemos. Rodríguez likewise sheds more light on the relationship between Zayas and Juan Pérez de Montalbán, whose fathers knew each other, and shows that the author had a sister called Isabel.

The only physical description of de Zayas, which is likely made in jest, comes from Francesc Fontanella in his Vejámenes:

Catalan	English
Doña María de Sayas viu ab cara varonil, que a bé que ‘sayas’ tenía, bigotes filava altius. Semblava an algun cavaller, mes jas’ vindrà a descubrir que una espasa mal se amaga baix las ‘sayas’ femenils. En la dècima tercera fou glosadora infeliz, que mala tercera té quant lo pris vol acquirir. per premiar sos bons desitgs del sèrcol de un guardainfant tindrà corona gentil!	Madame Maria de Zayas She lived with a manly face, what great skirt she had, mustaches spinning high. She resembled a gentleman, But, I have just come to discover that she poorly hides a sword, underneath the feminine skirts. In the third décima she was an unhappy commentator for she has such a bad third how quickly she wants to get in order to award her good desires of a farthingale's ? shall have a heathen crown.

== Major works ==
María de Zayas's principal works are her Novelas amorosas y ejemplares (Amorous and Exemplary Novels), published in 1637, and Desengaños amorosos (Disenchantments of Love), published in 1647. They are sometimes known as the Spanish Decameron because they followed a structure used by Giovanni Boccaccio. The collection consists of a number of stories or novelas (novelle in Italian) framed by one overarching one. Other examples of such collections are Chaucer's Canterbury Tales and Marguerite de Navarre's L'Heptémaron. Further influential novella writers from the period were Matteo Bandello and Masuccio Salernitano, some of whose stories Zayas adapted. In Spain Miguel de Cervantes published his Novelas ejemplares (Exemplary Stories in the English translation) in 1613, in which he dispensed with the frame narrative. Zayas's contemporaries Alonso Castillo Solórzano and Juan Pérez de Montalbán also wrote novellas. The genre allowed Zayas to tell a variety of stories, developing strong characters, and providing a showcase for her range.

The frame narrative of both collections revolves around Lisis, who has invited a group of her friends to her home to help her recover from an illness. In an attempt to lift her spirits, each of her friends narrates a story about a particular amorous experience. Two stories are narrated per night for a total of five nights. While the first book includes some episodes of violence and deception, it also includes more humorous stories, usually told by male narrators. The second collection is entirely female-narrated and is much darker in tone and focuses on the abuse of women, many of whom die at the hands of their husbands or male relatives. The female characters in both books are well developed, and their experience allows them to eloquently denounce their inferior role in society:

"Why vain legislators of the world, do you tie our hands so that we cannot take vengeance? Because of your mistaken ideas about us, you render us powerless and deny us access to pen and sword. Isn’t our soul the same as a man’s soul?.... [Later the husband listens her laments and approaches Laura] moving closer to her and incesed in an infernal rage, (Diego) began to beat her with his hands, so much so that the white pearls of her teeth, bathed in the blood shed by his angry hand, quickly took on the form of red coral" (tran. H. Patsy Boyer, The Enchantments of Love)

== Criticism ==
As recently as the early 1970s, scant attention was devoted to female writers of the Golden Age of Spain. In the 19th century Emilia Pardo Bazán helped to bring Zayas's work once again to the forefront, with her descriptions of Zayas's settings among the aristocracy of Madrid. With the exception of the occasional paragraph or two in histories of Spanish literature, however, critical studies on Zayas languished. Then, in 1976 Frederick A. de Armas foregrounded her work in his book The Invisible Mistress: Aspects of Feminism and Fantasy in the Golden Age. Here, he linked her work to that of playwright Ana Caro. In 1979, Sandra Foa studies the contrast between misogyny and feminism in Zayas. Six years later, Elizabeth Ordóñez analyzes Zayas and Caro together in "The Woman and her Text in the Works of María de Zayas and Ana Caro" (1985), and in 1989, a turning point was reached when, for the very first time, an entire section of the Kentucky Foreign Language Conference was devoted to the works of Zayas (including papers by Judith A. Whitenack, Amy R. Williamsen, Gwyn E. Campbell, and Margaret Greer). From that point on, Zayas studies were on their way. In 1991, Daniel L. Heiple wrote a creative essay in which he proposed the idea that both Lope de Vega and Zayas were reacting against Huarte de San Juan's misogynistic treatise Examen de ingenios (1575). During the 1990s, a variety of scholars, including Margaret Greer and Marina S. Brownlee (both in 2000), published influential monographs on the work of the Madrid writer. Translations (Patsy Boyer), conference papers, and essay collections (Judith Whitenack, Amy Williamsen, Gwyn Campbell) abounded. At the same time, scholars began to turn their attention to close studies of other women writers of Golden Age. Interest in "Gynocriticism", one popular term for the study of women writers, grew considerably during the 1990s and 2000s, and within studies of peninsular Spanish literature, both in the U.S. and Europe, much of the interest focused on Zayas's work,

In 2009 Golden Age scholar Anne J. Cruz summarized Margaret R. Greer's major study of Zayas's work thus: "Greer brings a welcome psychoanalytical perspective to Zayas’ novellas. Focusing on the various meaning of 'desire,' she investigates both the author's need to win over readers, and the role that sexual desire plays in structuring the fiction." In another well-known study, The Cultural Labyrinth of Maria de Zayas, Marina Brownlee argues that Zayas’s novelas were greatly influenced by Baroque culture, and were represented by a series of paradoxes. Brownlee explains how Zayas' women were themselves a paradox: the women were strong of character, but not strong enough to escape their particular negative situations. According to Brownlee, Zayas's belief was that the source of violence was the family, which was in turn an extension of a bigger institution, the Inquisition. She also points out that de Zayas' women were atypical females who chose to fight for revenge and defy their roles toward gender, race, sexuality, and class.

In the 21st century, several scholars, including Lisa Vollendorf, have also focused their attention on Zayas, and recently a new translation of several of Zayas's works has appeared by Margaret R. Greer and Elizabeth Rhodes. Echoing Brownlee's comments, Lisa Vollendorf’s Reclaiming the Body: Maria de Zayas’ Early Modern Feminism argues that Zayas used her prose to challenge the social view toward women. Vollendorf claims that Zayas's use of vivid images were intended for this purpose. She also explores Zayas's strong belief in the convent as a haven for women's independence. According to Vollendorf, Zayas had little expectation for change to occur by itself, and she became a voice urging women to seek independence and men to educate themselves about violence.

Zayas distinguished herself by writing about violence against women within the context of a "gender system" in Spain that was too universally accepted to change. She wrote within the confines of the Spanish Inquisition, during a time when women were closely monitored and kept from participating in any significant decision-making in the society. The paternalistic society of 17th-century Spain dictated the confinement of the majority of the women to the home, the convent, or brothels, and it was fortunate for Zayas that she was born into privilege and was able to avoid living this type of existence.

Feminist scholars tend to find that more than her first volume (Amorous and Exemplary Novels), it was her second volume, Desengaños amorosos, that became a literary milestone by presenting women as intelligent people who could present and defend arguments in the style of an "academia." The women are independent and demonstrate that they do not need a male in order to discourse on intelligent topics, and furthermore, that they are more than capable of following the same practical ground rules and protocols as the men do. The general theme of the arguments is the mistreatment of women at the hands of men. This desire for female camaraderie and independence was contrary to most of the portrayals of women of the era, and was a unique way of portraying women in a world where the men of the society were looked to for guidance and leadership. Rhodes offers a post-feminist analysis of Zayas's second collection of stories, uncovering fractures in what scholars tend to interpret as a pro-women agenda.

During much of the 20th century, the feminist literary canon in Spain was limited to one or two female writers. But Zayas and other writers of the 17th century, including her fellow Spaniards Ana Caro and Leonor de Meneses, as well as England's Aphra Behn, have been rediscovered by academics seeking to uncover or re-discover other first-rate works by unconventional voices.

Due to the limited biographical data available regarding Zayas's personal life, scholarly analysis remains primarily focused on her literary works.

== List of works ==
Spanish title	Boyer's translation	(More) literal translation
1632 La traición en la amistad	The Treachery in Friendship	"The Betrayal in Friendship"
Novelas amorosas y ejemplares, o Decamerón español	Enchantments of Love	"Amorous and Exemplary Novels, or, the Spanish Decameron"
Adventurarse perdiendo	Everything Ventured	"Losing Along the Journey"
La burlada Aminta y venganza de honor	Aminta Deceived and Honor's Revenge	"The Tricked Aminta and the Vengeance of Honor"
El castigo de la miseria	The Miser's Reward	"The Punishment of Misery2
El prevenido engañado	Forewarned but not Forearmed	"The Forewarned Man, Deceived"
La fuerza del amor	The Power of Love	"The force of Love"
El desengañado amando y premio de la virtud	Disillusionment in Love and Virtue Rewarded	"Revelation in Love and the Prize of Virtue"
Al fin se paga todo	Just Desserts	"At the End, Everything Pays Out"
El impossible vencido	Triumph over the Impossible	"The Impossible, Conquered"
Juez de su causa	Judge Thyself	"Judge of One's Cause"
El jardín engañoso	The Magic Garden	"The Deceptive Garden"
1647 Novelas y Saraos, and 1649 Parte segunda del Sarao y entretenimientos honestos, later collectively, Desengaños Amorosos	(collectively) Disenchantments of Love	"Novels and Soirées", "Second Part of the Soirée and Honost Entertainments", collectively, "Amorous Revelations"
La esclava de su amante	The Magic Garden	"As a slave of her lover"
La más infame venganza	Most Infamous Vengeance	"The Most Infamous Vengeance"
El verdugo de su esposa	His Wife's Executioner	"The Executioner of His Wife"
Tarde llega el desengaño	Too Late Undeceived	"The Truth Comes Late
Amar sólo por vencer	Love for the Sake of Conquest	"Loving Only to Conquer"
Mal presagio casar lejos	Marriage Abroad: Portent of Doom	"Bad Omen to Marry Far Away"
El traidor contra su sangre	Traitor of His Own Blood	"Traitor to His Blood"
La perseguida triunfante	Triumph over Persecution	"The Persecuted Woman, Triumphant"
Estragos que causa el vicio	The Ravages of Vice	"Ravages Caused by Vice"

== Editions ==
- Margaret R. Greer and Elizabeth Rhodes (ed. and tr.), María de Zayas y Sotomayor: Exemplary Tales of Love and Tales of Disillusion (Chicago, 2009) (The Other Voice in Early Modern Europe).

== Sources ==
- de Armas, Frederick A. (1976). The Invisible Mistress: Aspects of Feminism and Fantasy in the Golden Age. Charlottesville: Biblioteca Siglo de Oro.
- Brownlee, Marina S. (2000). The Cultural Labyrinth of María de Zayas. Philadelphia: University of Pennsylvania Press.
- Foa, Sandra (1979). Feminismo y forma narrativa: Estudio del tema y las técnicas de María de Zayas y Sotomayor. Valencia: Albatros.
- Greer, Margaret R. (2000). Maria de Zayas Tells Baroque Tales of Love and the Cruelty of Men. University Park: Penn State University Press.
- Heiple, Daniel L. (1991). "Profeminist Reactions to Huarte's Misogyny in Lope de Vega's La prueba de los ingenios and María de Zayas's Novelas amorosas y ejemplares". In Stoll, Anita K.; Smith, Dawn L. (eds.). The Perception of Women in Spanish Theater of the Golden Age. Lewisburg: Bucknell University Press. pp. 121–134.
- O'Brien, Eavan (2010). Women in the Prose of Maria de Zayas. London: Tamesis.
- Ordóñez, Elizabeth J. (1985). "The Woman and her Text in the Works of María de Zayas and Ana Caro". Revista de Estudios Hispánicos. 19: 3–15.
- Vollendorf, Lisa (2001). Reclaiming the Body: María de Zayas's Early Modern Feminism. Chapel Hill: University of North Carolina Press.
- Rhodes, Elizabeth (2011). Dressed to Kill: Death and Meaning in Zayas's Desengaños. Toronto: University of Toronto Press.
- Whitenack, Judith A.; Campbell, Gwyn E., eds. (2000). Zayas and Her Sisters, 1. An Anthology of 'Novelas' by Seventeenth-Century Spanish Women. Asheville, NC: Pegasus Press.
- Whitenack, Judith A.; Campbell, Gwyn E., eds. (2000). Zayas and Her Sisters, 2. Essays on 'Novelas' by Seventeenth-Century Spanish Women. Binghamton, NY: Global Publications.
- Williamsen, Amy R.; Whitenack, Judith A., eds. (1995). Maria de Zayas: The Dynamics of Discourse. Cranbury, NJ: Associated University Presses.
