= Škocjan, Koper =

Škocjan Sveti Tomaž (until 1955), San Canziano (Italian)
- Village
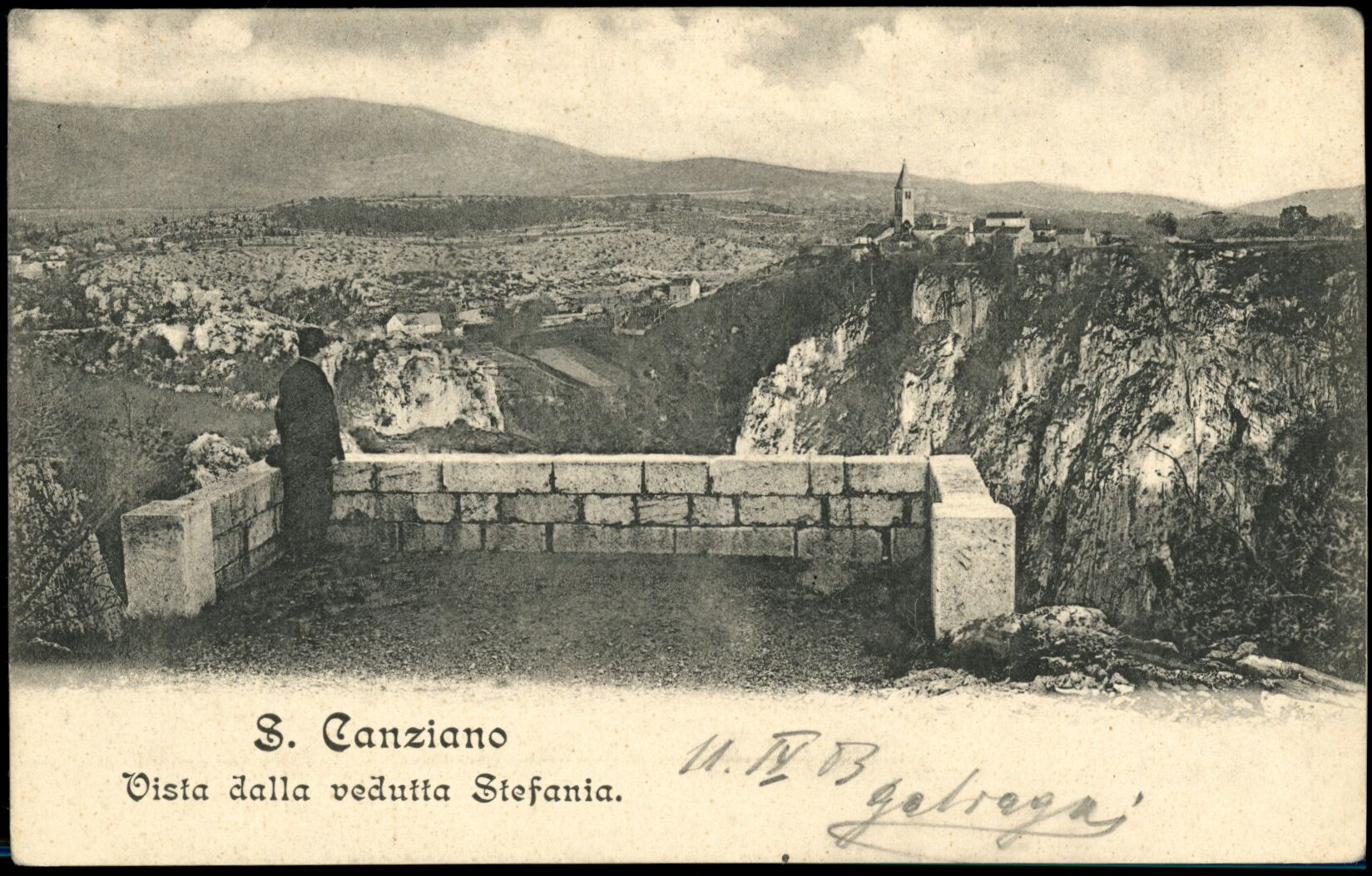
- 1903 postcard of Škocjan

- Location in Slovenia
- Coordinates: 45°31′52.7″N 13°46′30.38″E
- Country: Slovenia
- Traditional region: Littoral
- Statistical region: Coastal–Karst
- Municipality: Koper

Area
  - Total: 2.65 km^{2} (1.02 sq mi)
- Elevation: 48.2 m (158 ft)

Population (2002)
  - Total: 477

Škocjan (pronounced [ˈʃkɔːtsjan]) is a settlement on the outskirts of Koper in the Littoral region of Slovenia.

== Name ==
The name of the settlement was changed from Sveti Tomaž (literally, 'Saint Thomas') to Škocjan in 1955. The name was changed on the basis of the 1948 Law on Names of Settlements and Designations of Squares, Streets, and Buildings as part of efforts by Slovenia's postwar communist government to remove religious elements from toponyms.
