= T. R. Shaw =

English historian and speleologist (born 1928)

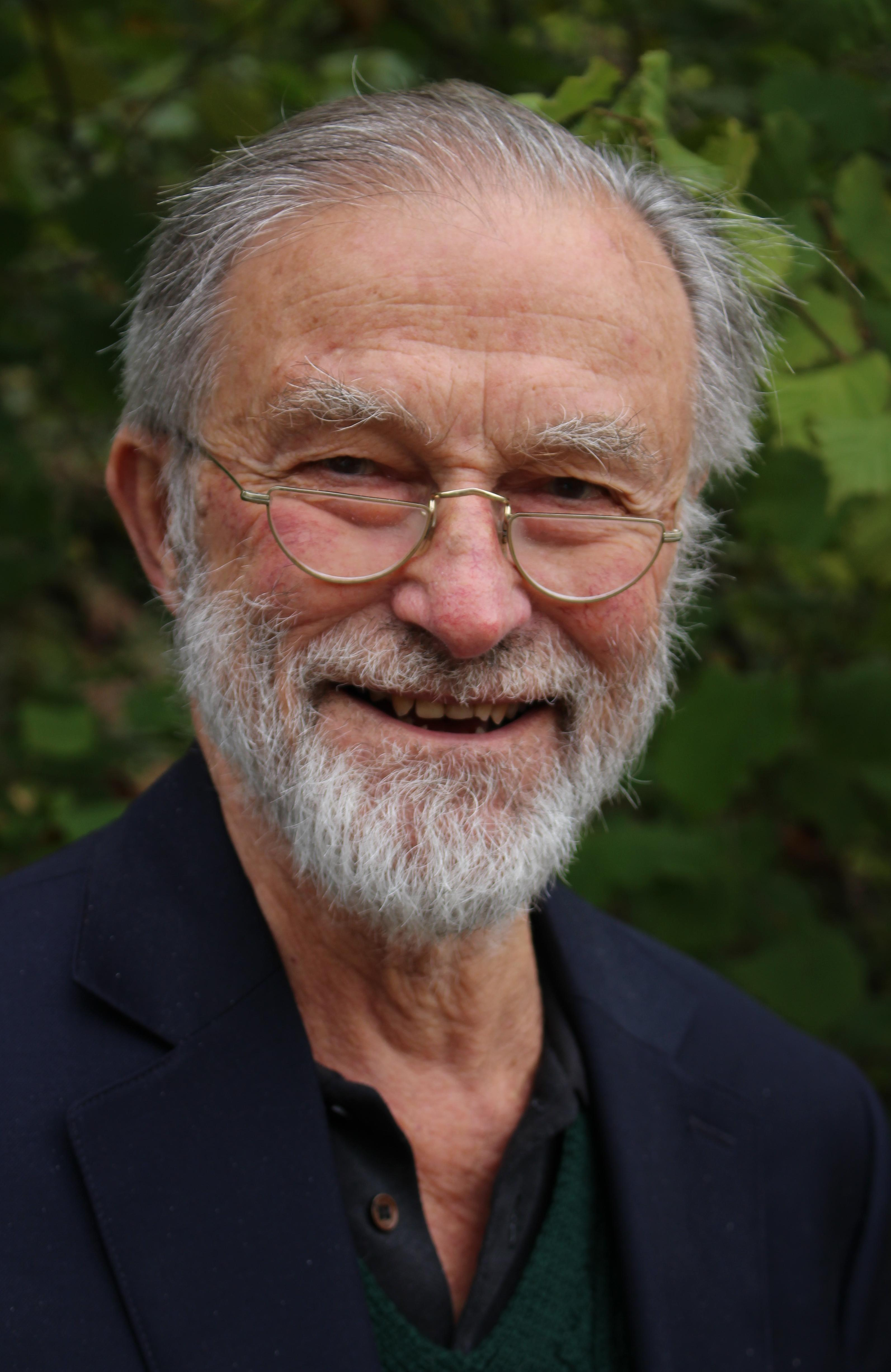
- On a field trip to Slovenia in 2017
- Born: 31 March 1928 (age 97)
- Known for: Speleology, history of speleology

Trevor R. Shaw, OBE (born 31 March 1928) is an English historian and speleologist.

An "assiduous compiler of data on caves", Shaw has published over 230 books and scientific articles during the course of his career, including detailed biographies and studies into the life of early speleologist Édouard-Alfred Martel.
