= Kacice =

Kacice may refer to:

- Kačice, a municipality and village in the Czech Republic
- Kacice, Lesser Poland Voivodeship, a village in Poland
- Kacice, Masovian Voivodeship, a village in Poland

== See also ==
- Kačiče-Pared, a settlement in Slovenia
