= Senadole =

Senadole Sinadole
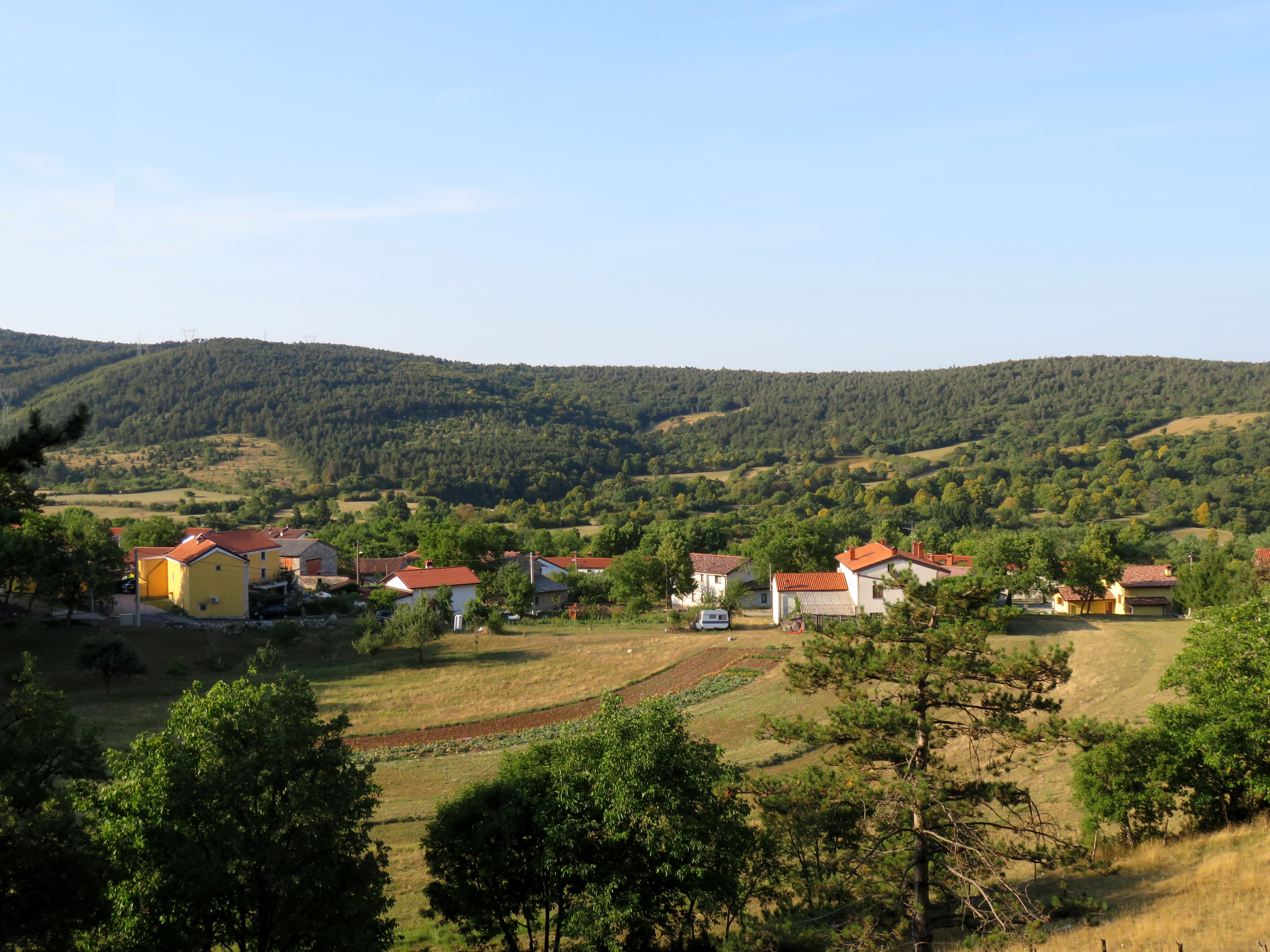

- Location in Slovenia
- Coordinates: 45°43′13.27″N 13°59′8.33″E
- Country: Slovenia
- Traditional region: Littoral
- Statistical region: Coastal–Karst
- Municipality: Divača

Area
  - Total: 4.99 km^{2} (1.93 sq mi)
- Elevation: 473.5 m (1,553 ft)

Population (2020)
  - Total: 76
  - Density: 15/km^{2} (39/sq mi)

Senadole (pronounced [sɛnaˈdoːlɛ]; Italian: Sinadole) is a village in the Municipality of Divača in the Littoral region of Slovenia.

== Church ==
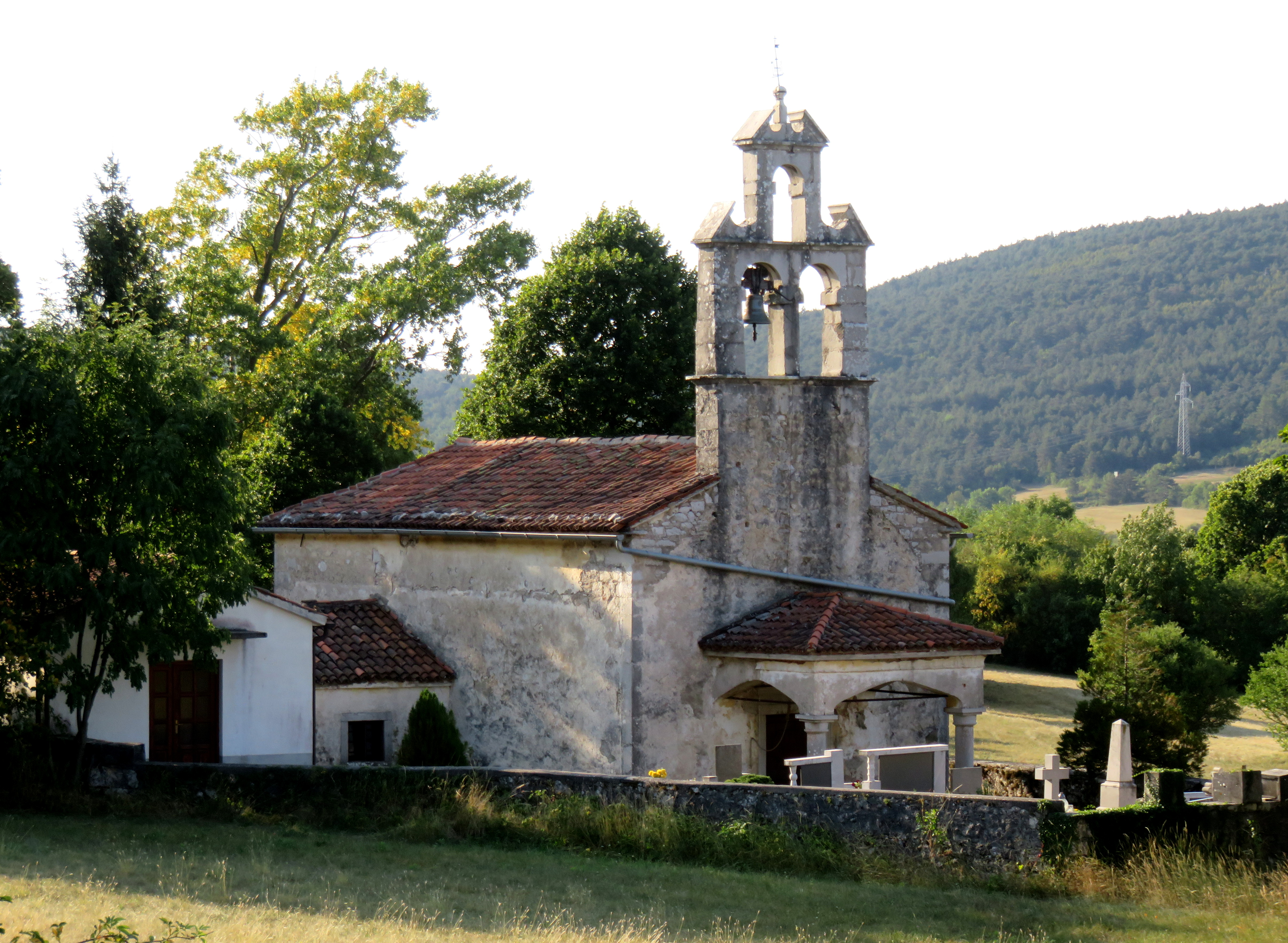
Holy Spirit Church

The local church is dedicated to the Holy Spirit and belongs to the Parish of Senožeče.
