= Betanja =

Betanja Bettanìa
- Location in Slovenia
- Coordinates: 45°40′2.09″N 13°59′38.12″E
- Country: Slovenia
- Traditional region: Littoral
- Statistical region: Coastal–Karst
- Municipality: Divača

Area
  - Total: 0.1 km^{2} (0.039 sq mi)
- Elevation: 399.9 m (1,312 ft)

Population (2020)
  - Total: 13
  - Density: 130/km^{2} (340/sq mi)

Betanja (pronounced [bɛˈtaːnja]; Italian: Bettanìa) is a small settlement above Matavun in the Municipality of Divača in the Littoral region of Slovenia.
