= Zavrhek =

Zavrhek Zaverco
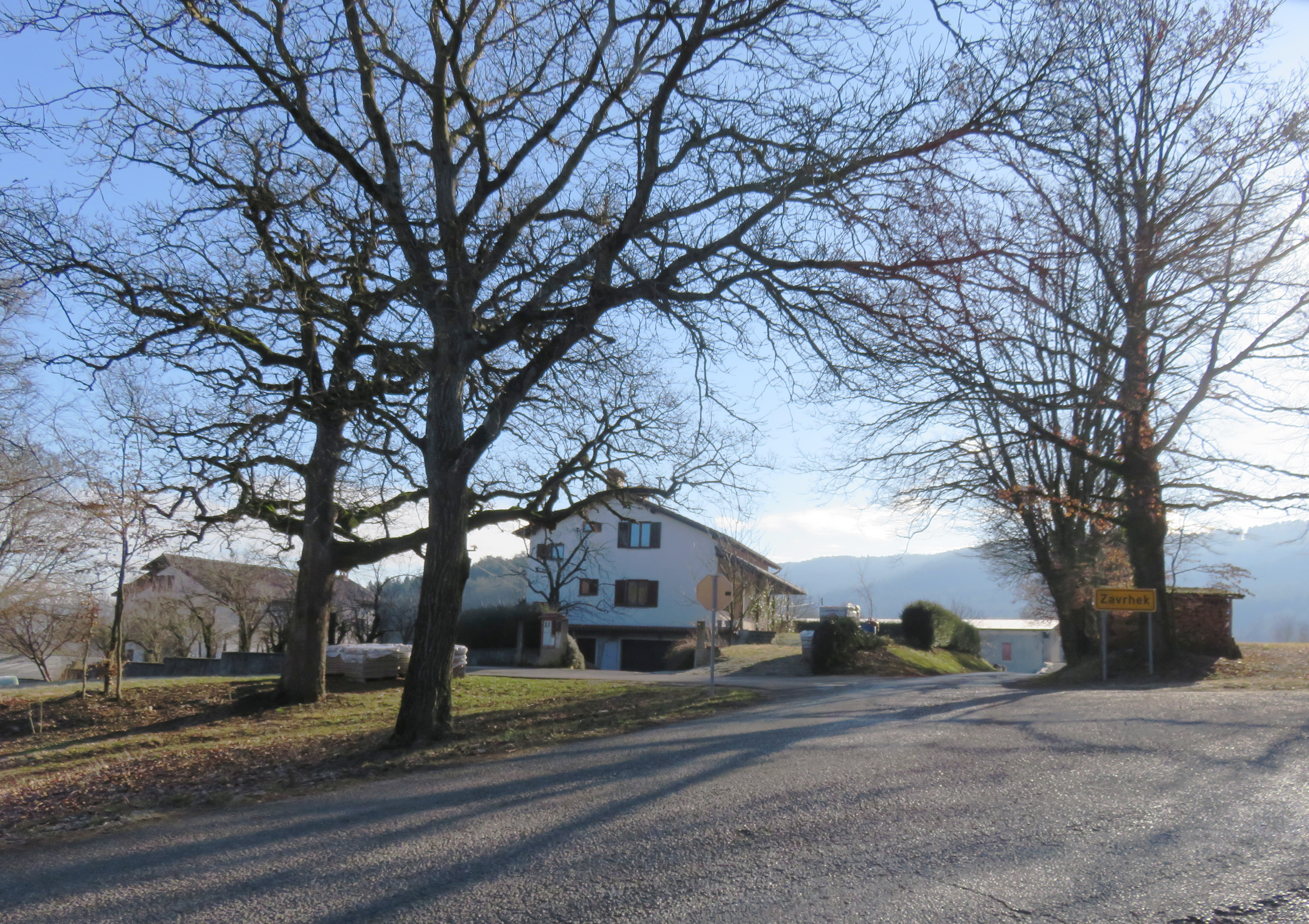

- Location in Slovenia
- Coordinates: 45°38′58.06″N 14°1′5.63″E
- Country: Slovenia
- Traditional region: Littoral
- Statistical region: Coastal–Karst
- Municipality: Divača

Area
  - Total: 3.81 km^{2} (1.47 sq mi)
- Elevation: 404.7 m (1,328 ft)

Population (2020)
  - Total: 54
  - Density: 14/km^{2} (37/sq mi)

Zavrhek (pronounced [zaˈʋəɾxək]; Italian: Zaverco) is a small settlement above Škoflje in the Municipality of Divača in the Littoral region of Slovenia.
