= Municipality of Divača =

Municipality of Slovenia

Municipality of Divača Občina Divača
- Municipality
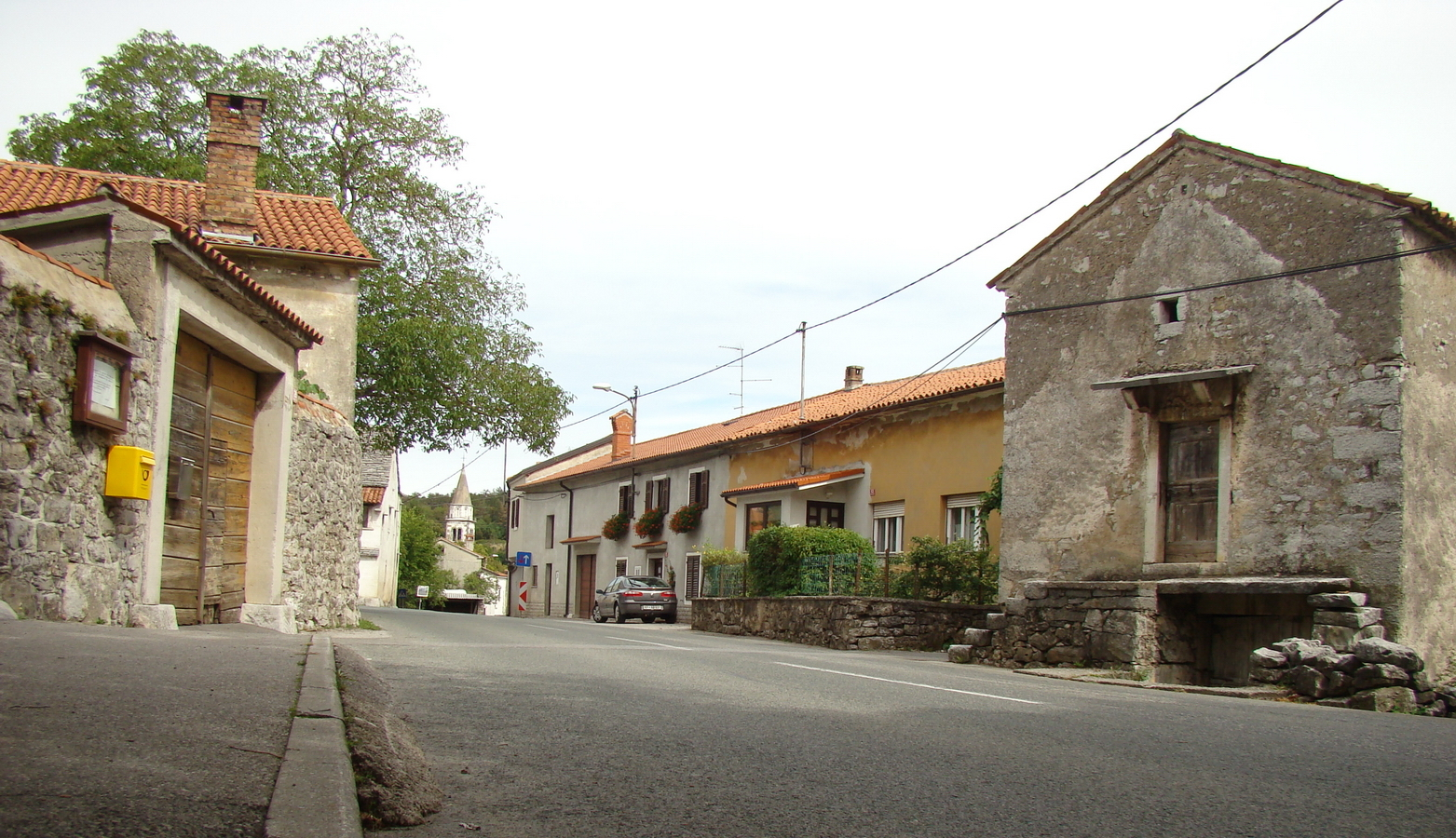

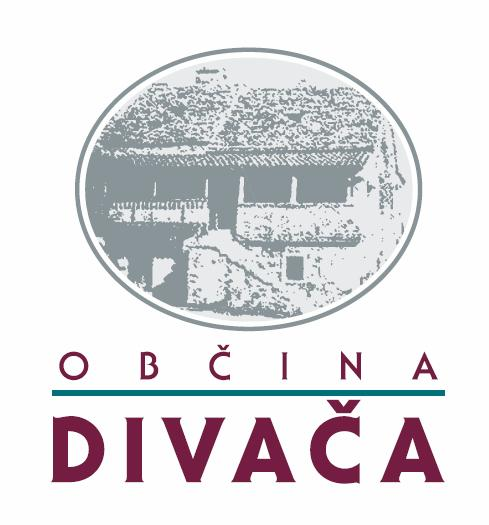
- Coat of arms

- Location of the Municipality of Divača in Slovenia
- Coordinates: 45°39′N 14°01′E
- Country: Slovenia

Government
  - Mayor: Drago Božac (Independent)

Area
  - Total: 147.8 km^{2} (57.1 sq mi)

Population (2002)
  - Total: 3,829
  - Density: 25.91/km^{2} (67.10/sq mi)
- Time zone: UTC+01 (CET)
  - Summer (DST): UTC+02 (CEST)
- Website: www.divaca.si

The Municipality of Divača (pronounced [diˈʋaːtʃa]; Slovene: Občina Divača) is a municipality in the Littoral region of Slovenia, near the Italian border. The seat of the municipality is the town of Divača. The municipality was established on 6 November 1994, when the former Municipality of Sežana was dissolved into four smaller municipalities (Divača, Hrpelje-Kozina, Komen, and Sežana). Škocjan Caves, a UNESCO World Heritage Site, is located in the municipality.

== Settlements ==
In addition to the municipal seat of Divača, the municipality also includes the following settlements:

- Barka
- Betanja
- Brežec pri Divači
- Dane pri Divači
- Dolenja Vas
- Dolnje Ležeče
- Dolnje Vreme
- Famlje
- Gabrče
- Goriče pri Famljah
- Gornje Ležeče
- Gornje Vreme
- Gradišče pri Divači
- Kačiče-Pared
- Kozjane
- Laže
- Matavun
- Misliče
- Naklo
- Otošče
- Podgrad pri Vremah
- Potoče
- Senadole
- Senožeče
- Škocjan
- Škoflje
- Vareje
- Vatovlje
- Vremski Britof
- Zavrhek

== Notable people ==
Notable people that were born in the Municipality of Divača include:

- Rudolf Cvetko (1880–1977), Olympic fencer
- Bogomir Magajna (1904–1963), writer and psychiatrist
- Ita Rina (1907–1979), actress
- Danilo Zelen (1907–1941), anti-Fascist insurgence leader
