= Dolenja Vas, Divača =

Dolenja Vas Villabassa di Senosècchia
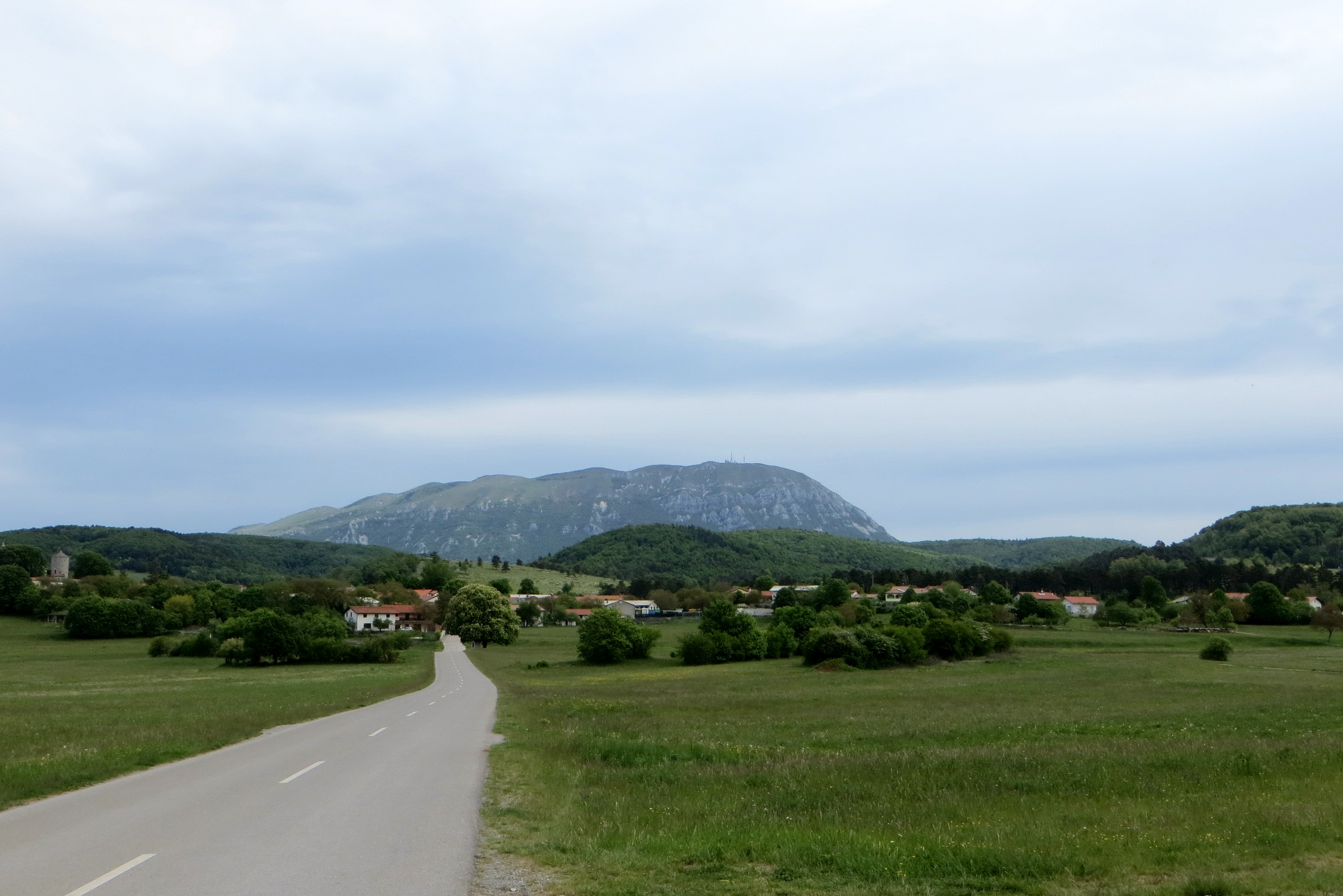

- Location in Slovenia
- Coordinates: 45°43′55.19″N 14°0′37.31″E
- Country: Slovenia
- Traditional region: Littoral
- Statistical region: Coastal–Karst
- Municipality: Divača

Area
  - Total: 13.74 km^{2} (5.31 sq mi)
- Elevation: 536.9 m (1,761 ft)

Population (2020)
  - Total: 154
  - Density: 11.2/km^{2} (29.0/sq mi)

Dolenja Vas (pronounced [dɔˈleːnja ˈʋaːs]; Slovene: Dolenja vas, Italian: Villabassa (di Senosècchia)) is a village in the Municipality of Divača in the Littoral region of Slovenia.

== Church ==
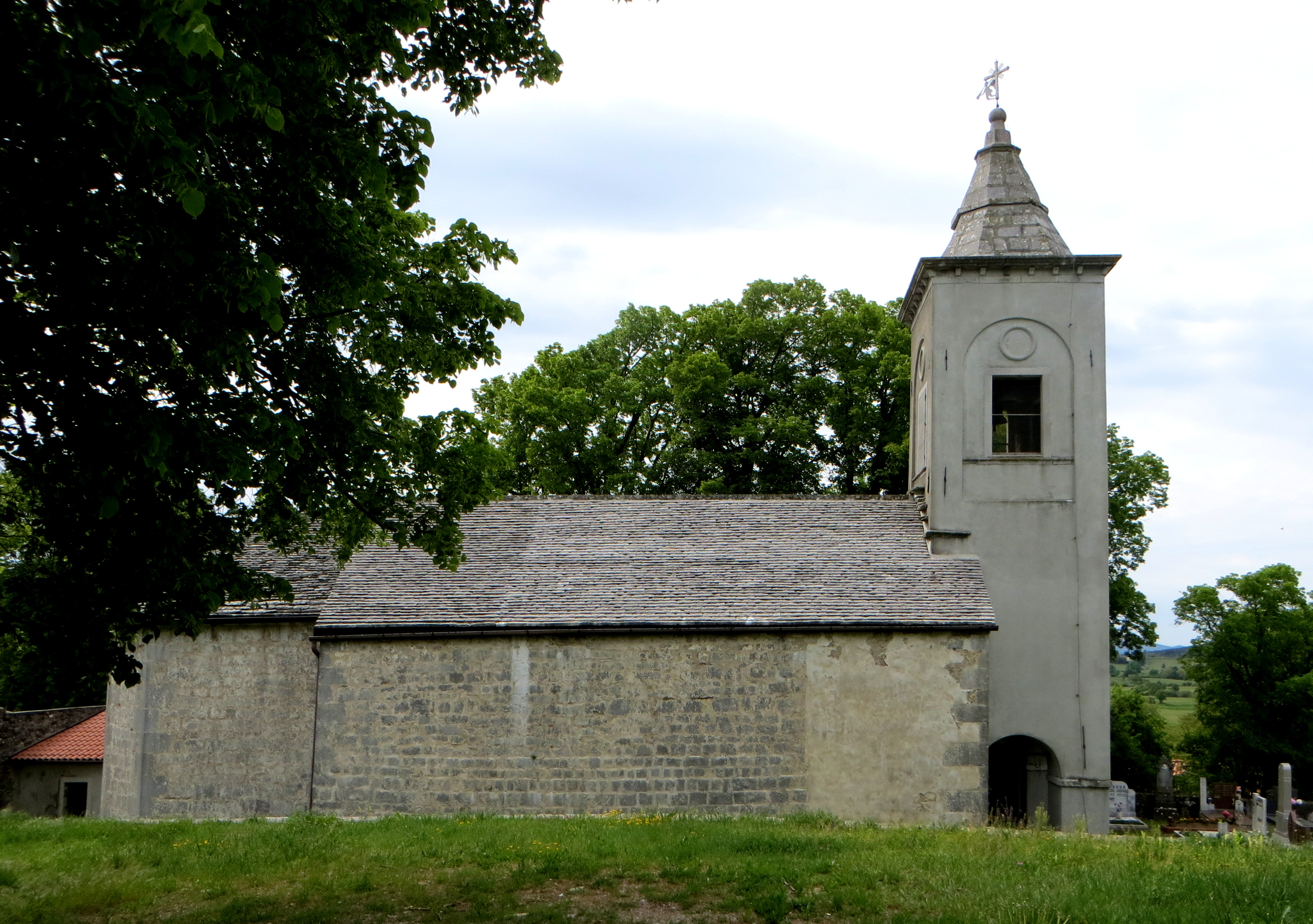
Our Lady of Sorrows Church

The local church is dedicated to Our Lady of Sorrows and belongs to the Parish of Senožeče.
