= Barka, Divača =

Barka Barca
- Village
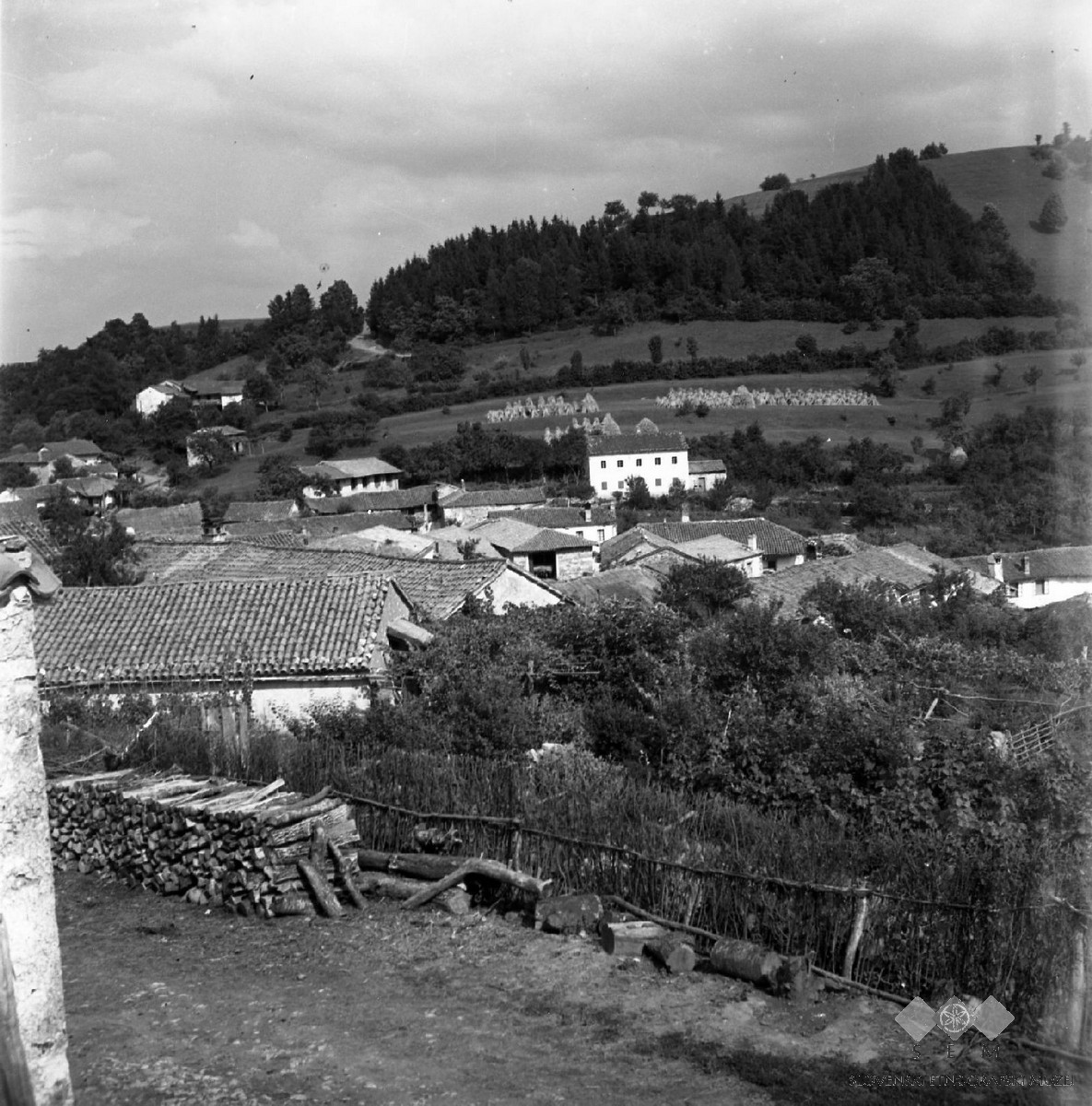
- Barka in 1955

- Location in Slovenia
- Coordinates: 45°38′23.77″N 14°3′6.3″E
- Country: Slovenia
- Traditional region: Littoral
- Statistical region: Coastal–Karst
- Municipality: Divača

Area
  - Total: 10.22 km^{2} (3.95 sq mi)
- Elevation: 609.9 m (2,001 ft)

Population (2020)
  - Total: 98
  - Density: 9.6/km^{2} (25/sq mi)

Barka (pronounced [ˈbaːɾka]; Italian: Barca) is a village in the Municipality of Divača in the Littoral region of Slovenia.

The local church is dedicated to Saint Cantianius and belongs to the Parish of Vatovlje.
