= Naklo, Divača =

Naklo
- Location in Slovenia
- Coordinates: 45°39′39.24″N 13°59′55.16″E
- Country: Slovenia
- Traditional region: Littoral
- Statistical region: Coastal–Karst
- Municipality: Divača

Area
  - Total: 2.59 km^{2} (1.00 sq mi)
- Elevation: 388 m (1,273 ft)

Population (2020)
  - Total: 56
  - Density: 22/km^{2} (56/sq mi)

Naklo (pronounced [ˈnaːklɔ]) is a small village in the Municipality of Divača in the Littoral region of Slovenia.

== Mass grave ==
Naklo is the site of a mass grave associated with the Second World War. The Preval Cave 2 Mass Grave (Slovene: Grobišče Jama na Prevali 2)—also known as the Big Preval Cave Mass Grave (Grobišče Velika jama na Prevali) or Fly Cave Mass Grave (Grobišče Mušja jama)—is located on the edge of the woods southwest of Matavun. It contains the remains of Slovene civilians and was discovered in 1982.
