= Gabrče =

Gabrče Gaberce Auremiano
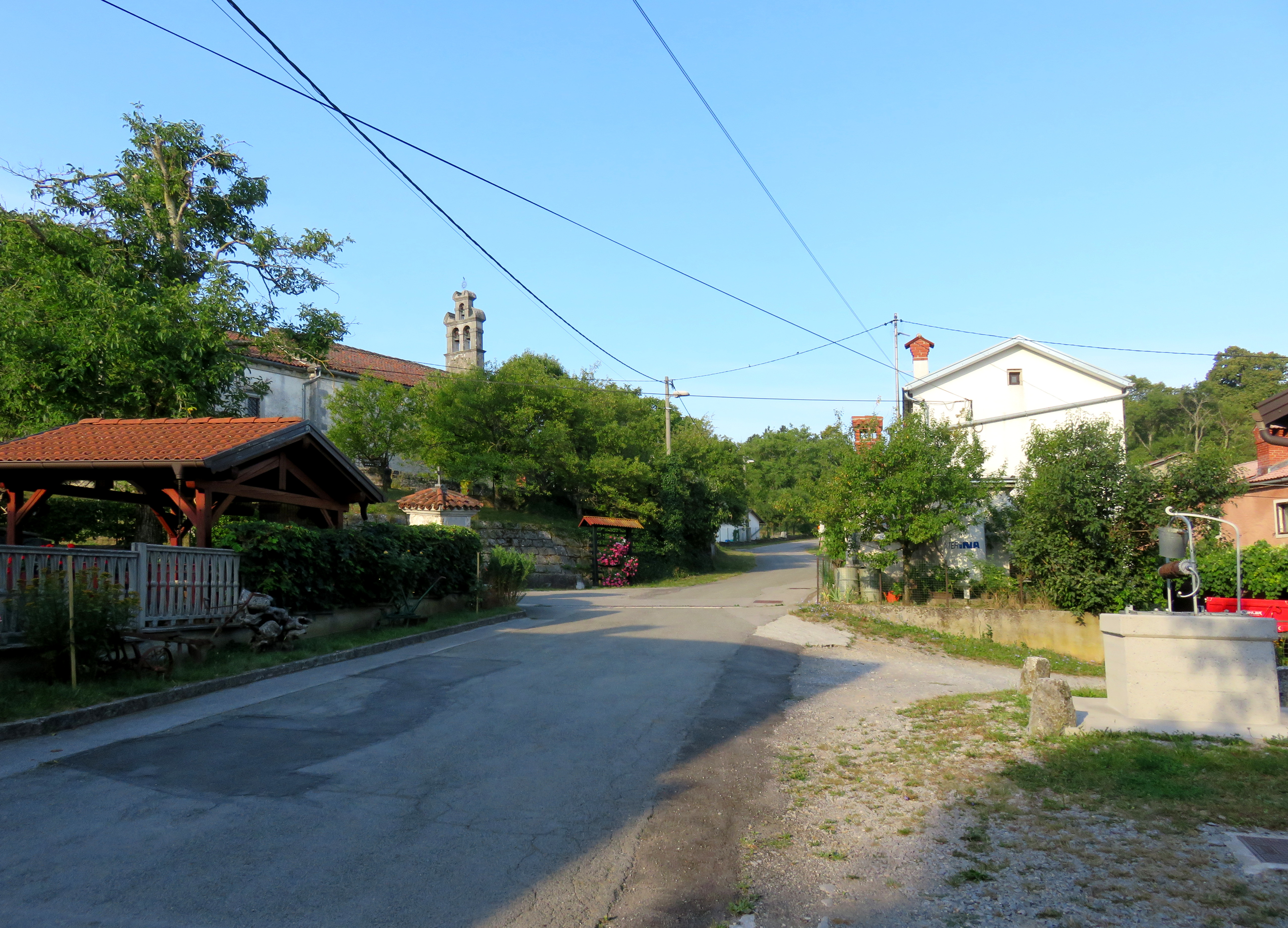

- Location in Slovenia
- Coordinates: 45°42′45.59″N 14°1′20.16″E
- Country: Slovenia
- Traditional region: Littoral
- Statistical region: Coastal–Karst
- Municipality: Divača

Area
  - Total: 4.74 km^{2} (1.83 sq mi)
- Elevation: 577.6 m (1,895 ft)

Population (2020)
  - Total: 40
  - Density: 8.4/km^{2} (22/sq mi)

Gabrče (pronounced [ˈɡaːbəɾtʃɛ]; Italian: Gaberce Auremiano) is a village southwest of Senožeče in the Municipality of Divača in the Littoral region of Slovenia.

== Church ==
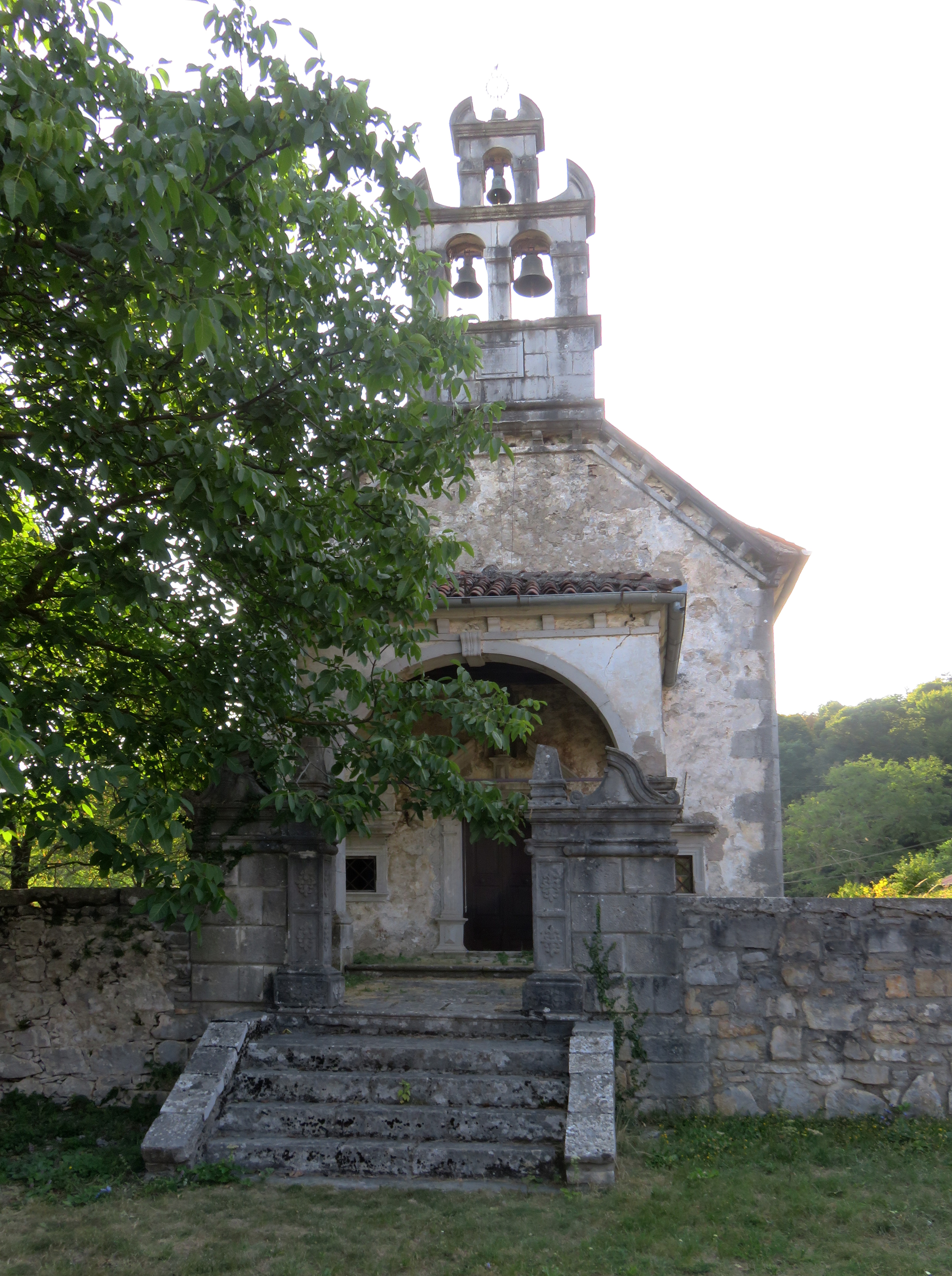
Saint Anthony of Padua Church

The local church is dedicated to Saint Anthony of Padua and belongs to the Parish of Senožeče.
