= Potoče, Divača =

Potoče Potocce di Villabassa
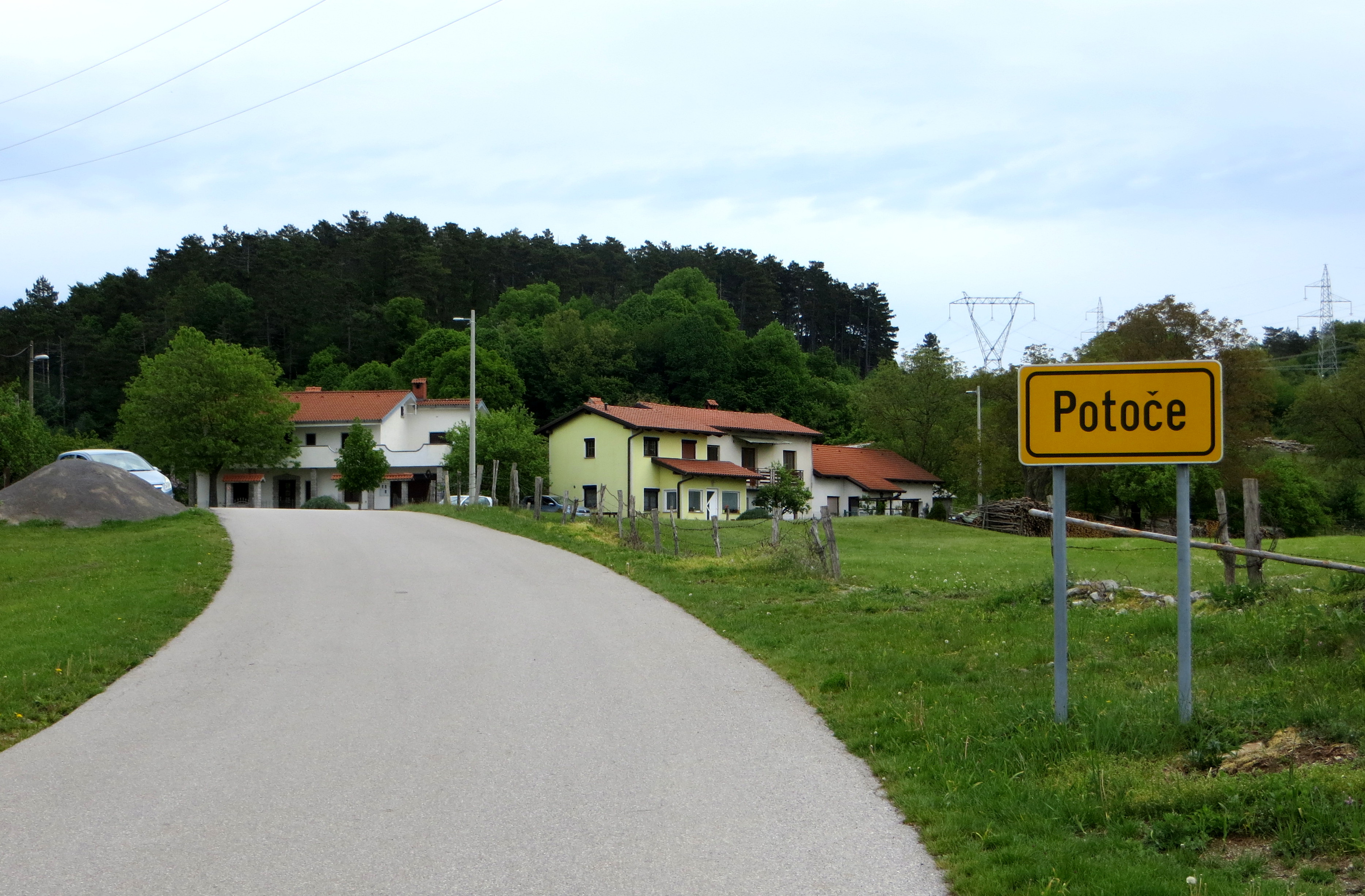

- Location in Slovenia
- Coordinates: 45°43′37.77″N 14°1′23.87″E
- Country: Slovenia
- Traditional region: Littoral
- Statistical region: Coastal–Karst
- Municipality: Divača

Area
  - Total: 3.9 km^{2} (1.5 sq mi)
- Elevation: 561.7 m (1,843 ft)

Population (2020)
  - Total: 48
  - Density: 12/km^{2} (32/sq mi)

Potoče (pronounced [pɔˈtoːtʃɛ]; Italian: Potocce, Potocce di Villabassa) is a village in the Municipality of Divača in the Littoral region of Slovenia.

== Church ==
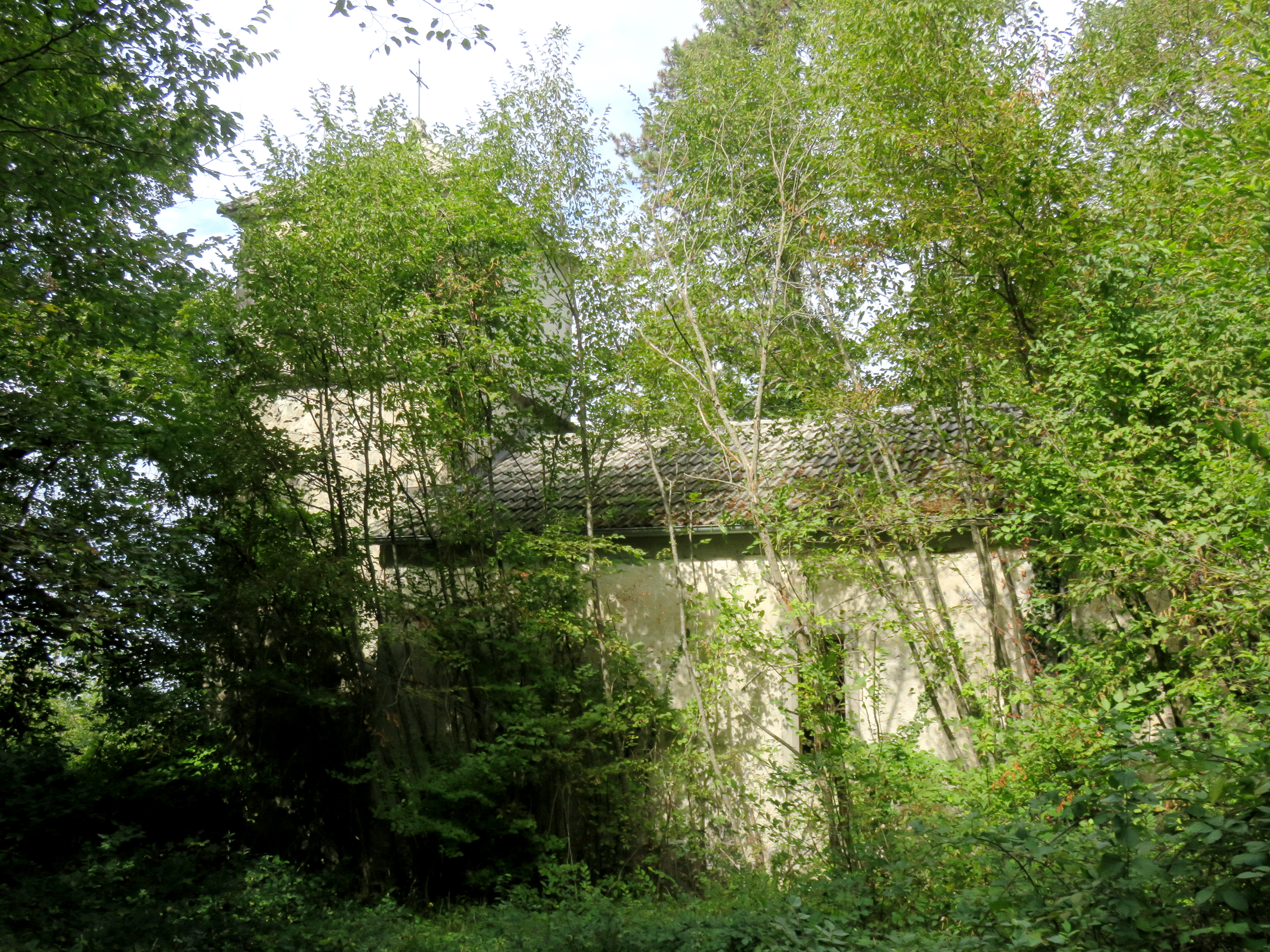
View from south

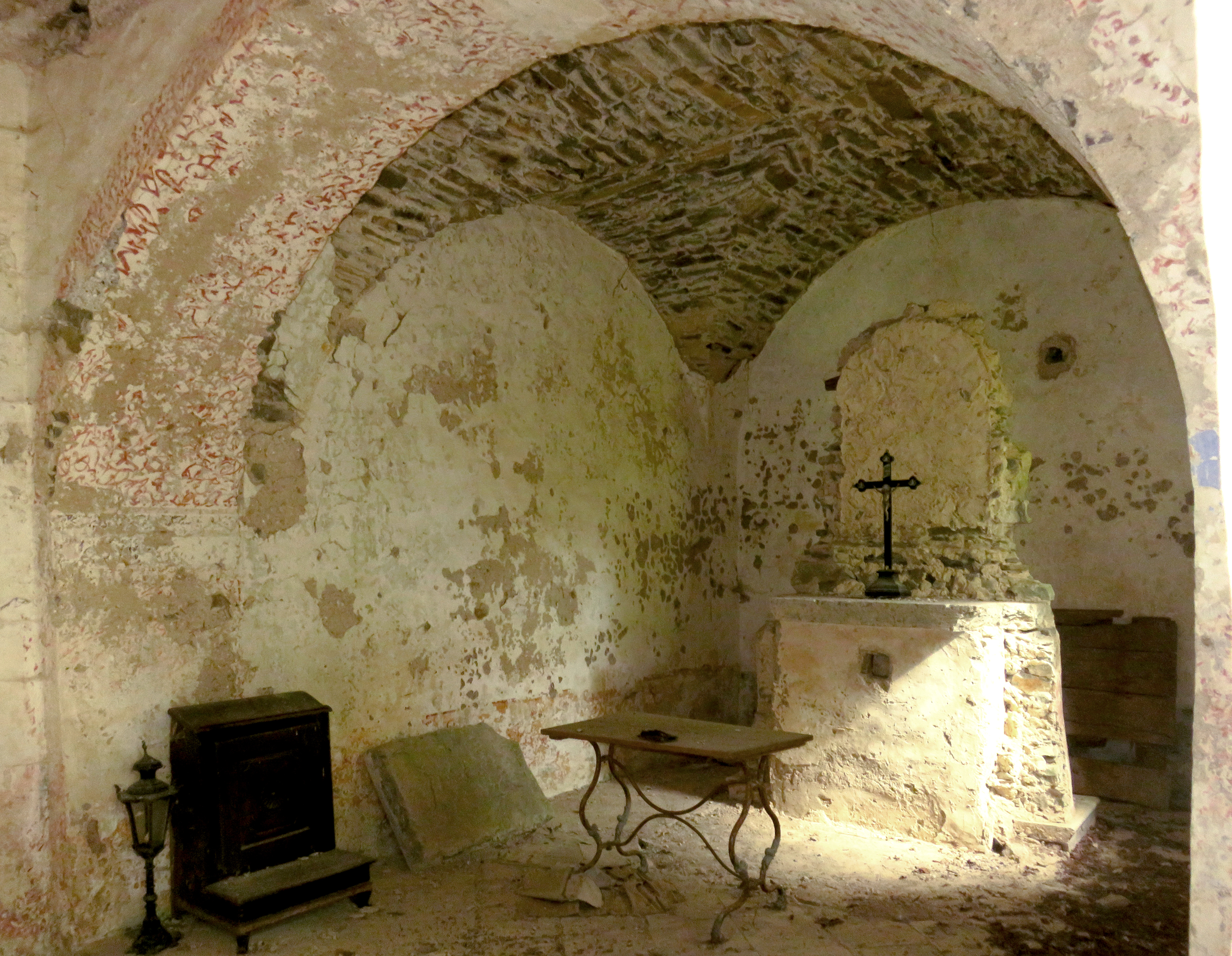
Interior

Saint George's Church

The local church, now abandoned, is dedicated to Saint George and belongs to the Parish of Senožeče. The church was built in 1526 and remodeled in 1655. It has a rectangular groin-vaulted chancel, a wide nave with a stuccoed ceiling, and a squat belltower over the entrance.
