= Goriče pri Famljah =

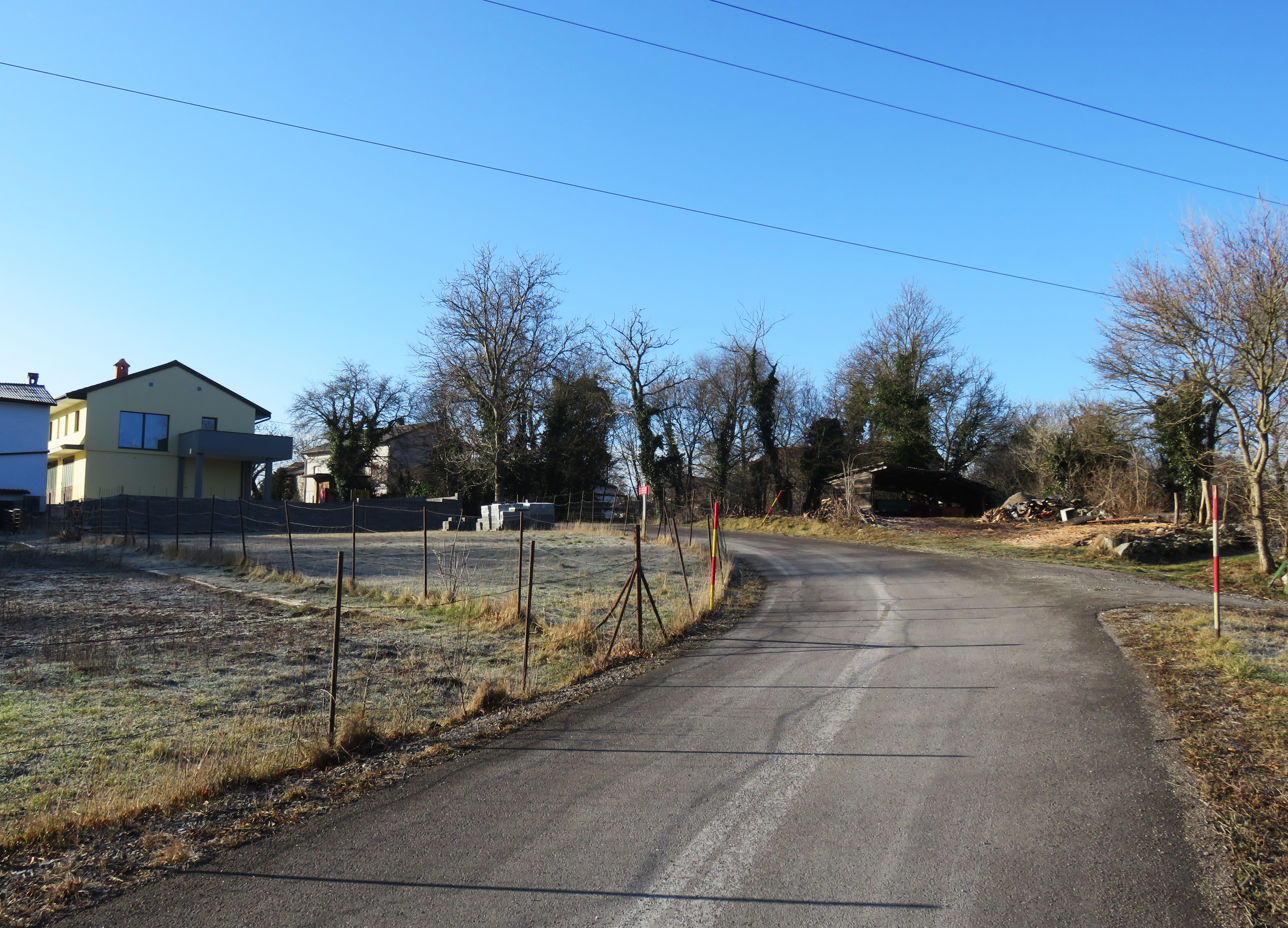

- Location in Slovenia
- Coordinates: 45°40′5.93″N 14°0′47.35″E
- Country: Slovenia
- Traditional region: Littoral
- Statistical region: Coastal–Karst
- Municipality: Divača

Area
  - Total: 6.77 km^{2} (2.61 sq mi)
- Elevation: 439.9 m (1,443 ft)

Population (2020)
  - Total: 29
  - Density: 4.3/km^{2} (11/sq mi)

Goriče pri Famljah (pronounced [ɡɔˈɾiːtʃe pɾi ˈfaːmljax]) is a small village north of Famlje in the Municipality of Divača in the Littoral region of Slovenia.

== Name ==
The name of the settlement was changed from Goriče to Goriče pri Famljah in 1955.
