= Gornje Ležeče =

Gornje Ležeče Lesecce Auremiano
- Location in Slovenia
- Coordinates: 45°39′59.28″N 14°4′13.1″E
- Country: Slovenia
- Traditional region: Littoral
- Statistical region: Coastal–Karst
- Municipality: Divača

Area
  - Total: 4.74 km^{2} (1.83 sq mi)
- Elevation: 521 m (1,709 ft)

Population (2020)
  - Total: 41
  - Density: 8.6/km^{2} (22/sq mi)

Gornje Ležeče (pronounced [ˈɡoːɾnjɛ lɛˈʒeːtʃɛ]; Italian: Lesecce Auremiano) is a small village in the Municipality of Divača in the Littoral region of Slovenia.
