= Otošče =

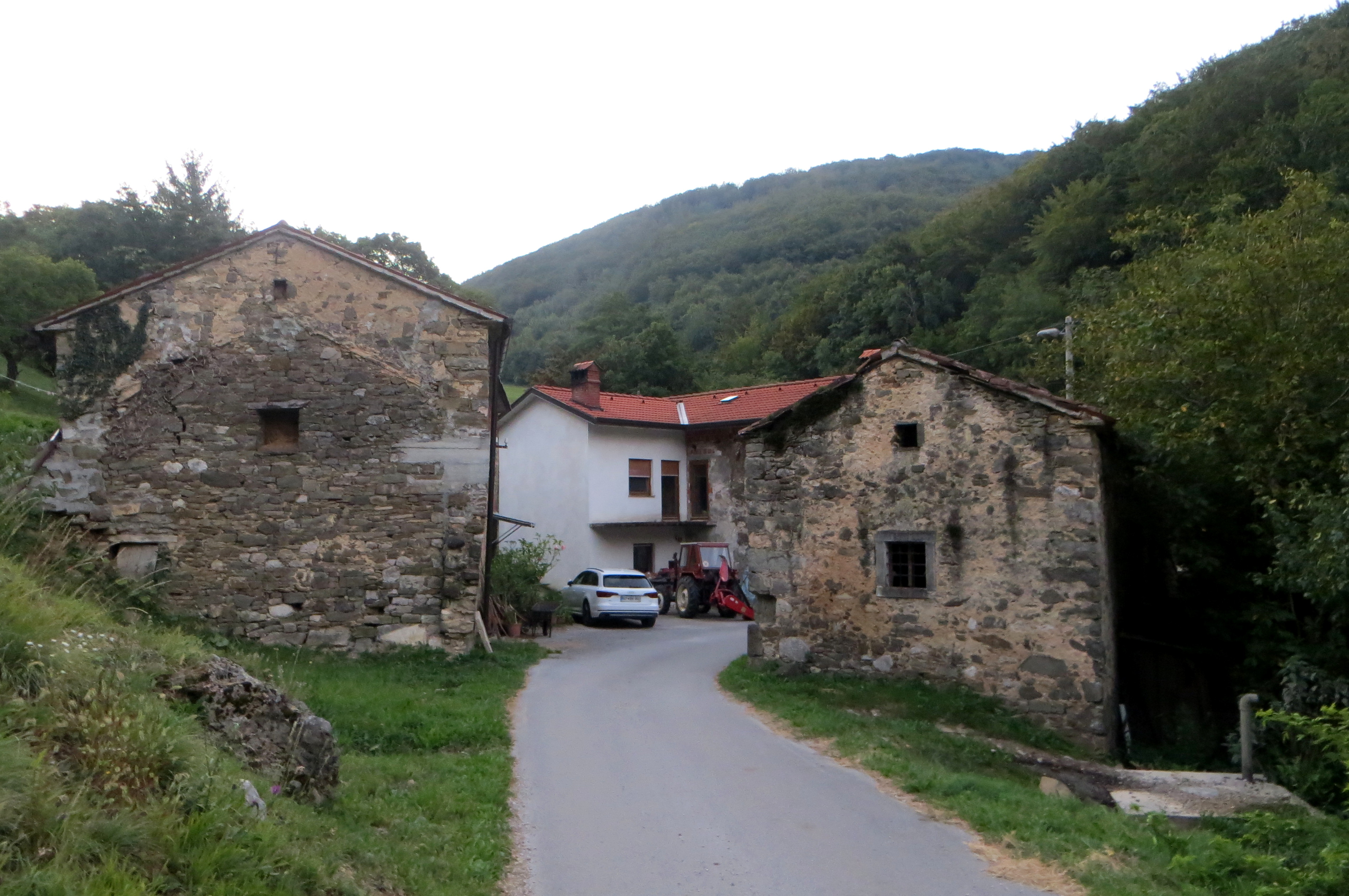

- Location in Slovenia
- Coordinates: 45°45′44.44″N 14°1′25.37″E
- Country: Slovenia
- Traditional region: Littoral
- Statistical region: Coastal–Karst
- Municipality: Divača

Area
  - Total: 5.44 km^{2} (2.10 sq mi)
- Elevation: 325.2 m (1,067 ft)

Population (2020)
  - Total: 21
  - Density: 3.9/km^{2} (10/sq mi)

Otošče (pronounced [ɔˈtoːʃtʃɛ]) is a settlement in the Municipality of Divača in the Littoral region of Slovenia.

The local church is dedicated to Mary Magdalene and belongs to the Parish of Lozice.
