= Kozjane, Divača =

Kozjane
- Village
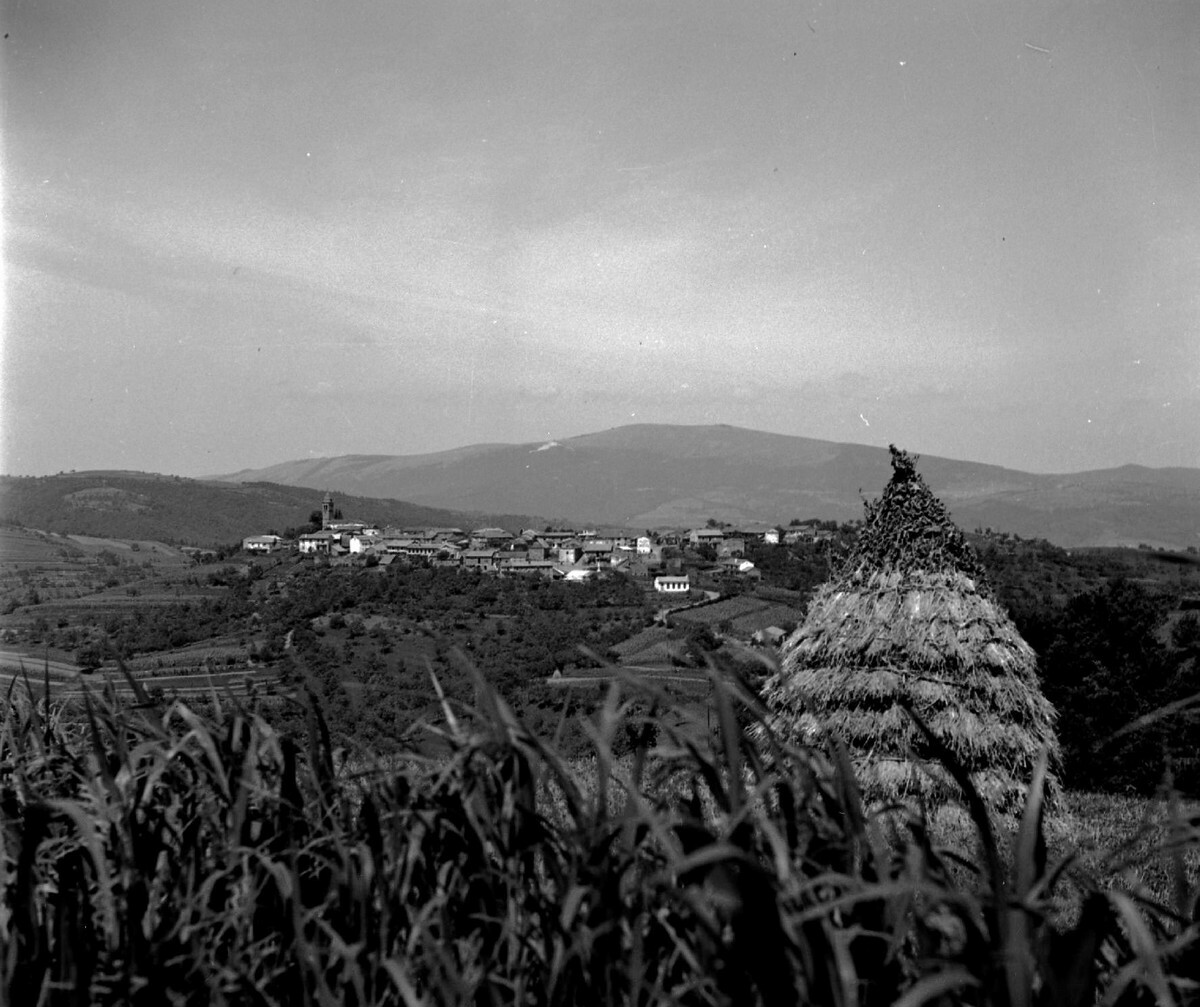
- Kozjane in 1955

- Location in Slovenia
- Coordinates: 45°36′53.79″N 14°4′35.52″E
- Country: Slovenia
- Traditional region: Littoral
- Statistical region: Coastal–Karst
- Municipality: Divača

Area
  - Total: 5.25 km^{2} (2.03 sq mi)
- Elevation: 599 m (1,965 ft)

Population (2020)
  - Total: 13
  - Density: 2.5/km^{2} (6.4/sq mi)

Kozjane (pronounced [kɔˈzjaːnɛ]) is a settlement in the Municipality of Divača in the Littoral region of Slovenia.
