= Gornje Vreme =

Gornje Vreme Auremo di Sopra
- Village
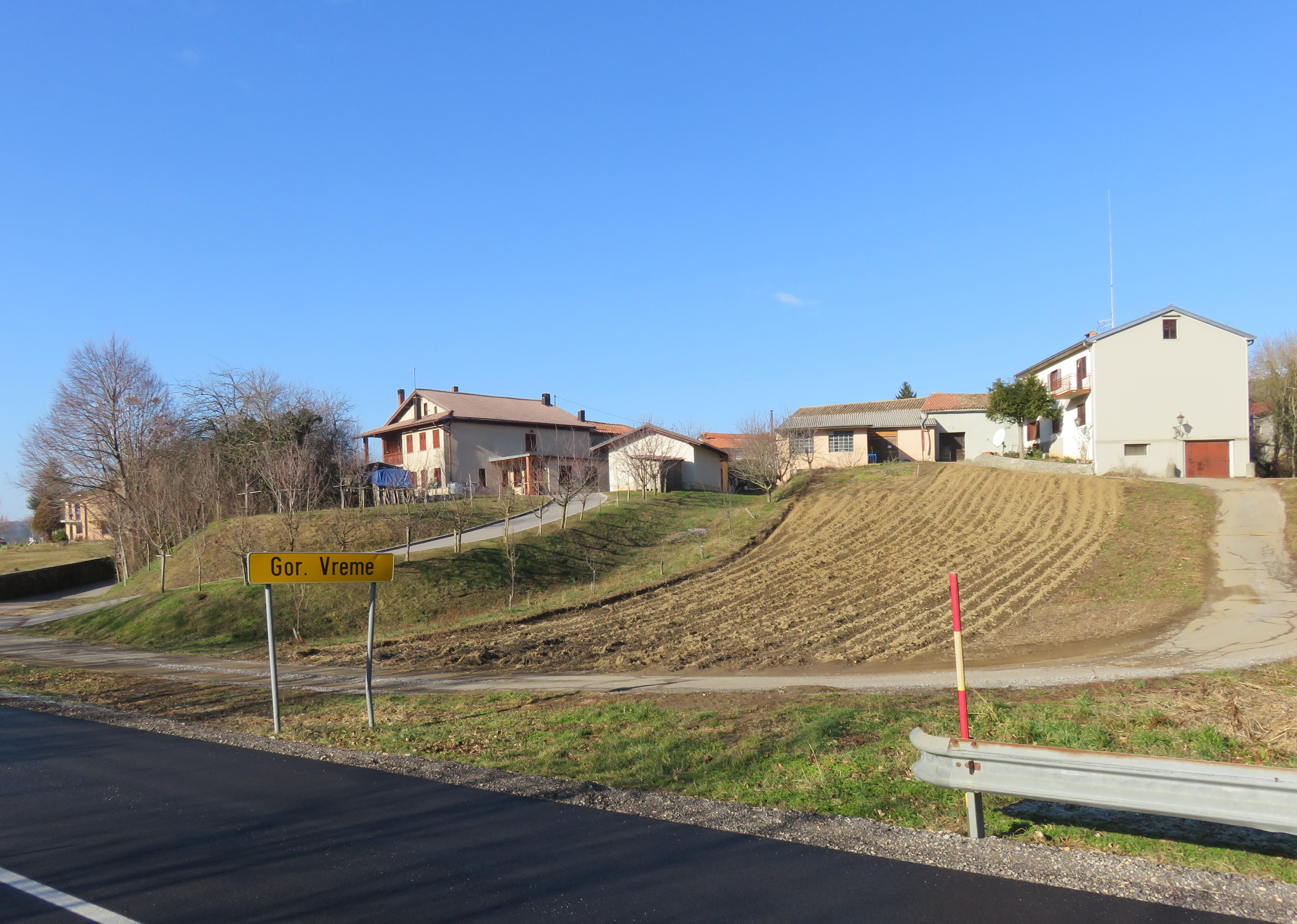

- Location in Slovenia
- Coordinates: 45°40′38″N 14°3′0″E
- Country: Slovenia
- Traditional region: Inner Carniola
- Statistical region: Coastal–Karst
- Municipality: Divača
- Elevation: 367 m (1,204 ft)

Population (2020)
  - Total: 88

Gornje Vreme (pronounced [ˈɡoːɾnjɛ ˈwɾeːmɛ], German: Oberurem, Italian: Auremo di Sopra) is a village on the banks of the Reka River in the Municipality of Divača in the Littoral region of Slovenia.

== Notable people ==
Notable people that were born or lived in Gornje Vreme include:

- Bogomir Magajna (1904–1963), psychiatrist and writer
