= Brežec pri Divači =

Brežec pri Divači Brese
- Location in Slovenia
- Coordinates: 45°40′12.3″N 13°59′57.34″E
- Country: Slovenia
- Traditional region: Littoral
- Statistical region: Coastal–Karst
- Municipality: Divača

Area
  - Total: 1.07 km^{2} (0.41 sq mi)
- Elevation: 418.7 m (1,374 ft)

Population (2020)
  - Total: 26
  - Density: 24/km^{2} (63/sq mi)

Brežec pri Divači (pronounced [ˈbɾeːʒəts pɾi diˈʋaːtʃi]; Italian: Brese) is a small settlement in the Municipality of Divača in the Littoral region of Slovenia.

== Name ==
The name of the settlement was changed from Brežec to Brežec pri Divači in 1955.
