= Bogomir Magajna =

Slovene writer and psychiatrist

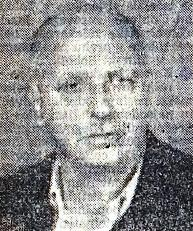
- Born: January 13, 1904 Gornje Vreme, Austria-Hungary (now in Slovenia)
- Died: March 27, 1963 (aged 59) Ljubljana, Slovenia
- Occupation: Writer, psychiatrist

Bogomir Magajna (January 13, 1904 – March 27, 1963) was a Slovene writer and psychiatrist.

== Biography ==
Magajna was born in 1904 into a farming family in Gornje Vreme near Divača in what was then the Austrian Littoral. He began his schooling in Vremski Britof and was later sent to the Collegium Marianum (Marijanišče), Catholic boarding-school in Ljubljana. This is where he began to write. After finishing secondary schooling he studied medicine in Ljubljana and Zagreb and specialised in psychiatry. He worked in the psychiatric hospital in Ljubljana for most of his career, though he also worked for short periods in Logatec and Sarajevo. During this period, he became active in the circle of young Catholic and Christian Socialist intellectuals, who gathered around the journal Križ na gori. He became a friend of prominent artists and intellectuals, such as Edvard Kocbek and Božo Vodušek, Miran Jarc and Rajko Ložar. He was also a close friend and advisor to the avant-garde poet Srečko Kosovel.

During the Second World War, he was interned in an Italian concentration camp for a while and then joined the partisans where he worked as a doctor and also edited the Partisan Medical Journal. After the war he returned to work in the hospital in Ljubljana. He lectured in various towns around Slovenia. He died in Ljubljana. Bogomir Magajna Primary School in Divača is named after him.

== Work ==
Magajna wrote some adult fiction. He used images from his work in his writing and some of his best characters are troubled by serious illness which affects all aspects of their lives (Zaznamovani (The Marked) collection of short stories, Ljubljana 1940). He also wrote stories for children. The stories Brkonja Čeljustnik (1933) and Racko and Lija are his best known works. Brkonja Čeljustnik is a story about a gentle giant who helps many people, only to turn against them in disappointment when his long moustache is chopped off. Things are eventually sorted out with a bit of magic and the perseverance of a brave and honest boy. Racko and Lija is a collection of 17 short stories about a young boy's attempts to understand the adult world.

=== Adult fiction ===
- Primorske novele (Stories from the Littoral) (1930)
- Bratje in sestre (Brothers and Sisters), short stories (1932)
- Gornje mesto (Upper Town), novel (1932)
- Graničarji (Borderguards), short stories (1934)
- Le hrepenenja (Just Desires), short stories (1937)
- Zaznamovani (The Marked), collection of stories (1940)
- Oživeli obrazi (Remembered Faces) legends and songs in prose(1943)
- Odmev korakov (Echos of Steps) short stories (1953)
- Zgodbe o lepih ženah (Stories of Beautiful Women) (1955)
- Na bregovih srca (On the Banks of the Heart) collection of stories (1957)
- Življenje in sanje (Life and Dreams) (1965)

=== For children ===
- Racko in Lija, collection of stories (Racko and Lija) (1932)
- Brkonja Čeljustnik, fairytale (1933)
- Čudovita pravljica o Vidu in labodu belem ptiču, (The Wonderful Tale about Vid and the White Swan) (1937)
- V deželi pravljic in sanj (In the Land of Fairytales and Dreams) (1952)
- O zlatem klasu, zlatem grozdu in biseru, fairytale (The Golden Ear of Corn, the Golden Grape and the Pearl) (1955)
- Povestice o punčki Maji (Stories About Little Maja) (1957)
