= Dane pri Divači =

Dane pri Divači Danne
- Location in Slovenia
- Coordinates: 45°38′59.88″N 13°58′59.97″E
- Country: Slovenia
- Traditional region: Littoral
- Statistical region: Coastal–Karst
- Municipality: Divača

Area
  - Total: 3.54 km^{2} (1.37 sq mi)
- Elevation: 451.1 m (1,480 ft)

Population (2020)
  - Total: 62
  - Density: 18/km^{2} (45/sq mi)

Dane pri Divači (pronounced [ˈdaːnɛ pɾi diˈʋaːtʃi]; Italian: Danne) is a small village south of Divača in the Littoral region of Slovenia.

== Name ==
Dane was attested in written sources c. 1400 as Podenn, and in 1412 as zw Podem, both German names. The semantically equivalent Slovene name is derived from the Slavic common noun *dъno '(valley) bottom, valley floor', referring to a place where flowing water disappears into the ground. There are several losing streams in the area. The name of the settlement was changed from Dane to Dane pri Divači in 1952.

== History ==
The remnants of a prehistoric hillfort have been identified on Valerija Hill (elevation 511 meters or 1,677 feet), which stands about 700 meters (2,300 ft) northeast of the modern village core, attesting to early settlement of the area. According to oral tradition, the village formerly stood at a higher elevation slightly south of its present location. The microtoponym Stare Dane 'old Dane' is used for this site.
