= Podgrad pri Vremah =

Podgrad pri Vremah Nigrignano Podgrad-Potok (until 1955)
- Location in Slovenia
- Coordinates: 45°37′42.63″N 14°1′11.57″E
- Country: Slovenia
- Traditional region: Littoral
- Statistical region: Coastal–Karst
- Municipality: Divača

Area
  - Total: 4.64 km^{2} (1.79 sq mi)
- Elevation: 548.4 m (1,799 ft)

Population (2020)
  - Total: 21
  - Density: 4.5/km^{2} (12/sq mi)

Podgrad pri Vremah (pronounced [pɔdˈɡɾáːt pɾi ˈwɾeːmax, ˈpɔ̀ːdɡɾat]; Italian: Nigrignano) is a settlement in the Municipality of Divača in the Littoral region of Slovenia.

== Name ==
The name of the settlement was changed from Podgrad-Potok to Podgrad pri Vremah in 1955.
