= Vareje =

Vareje Varèa
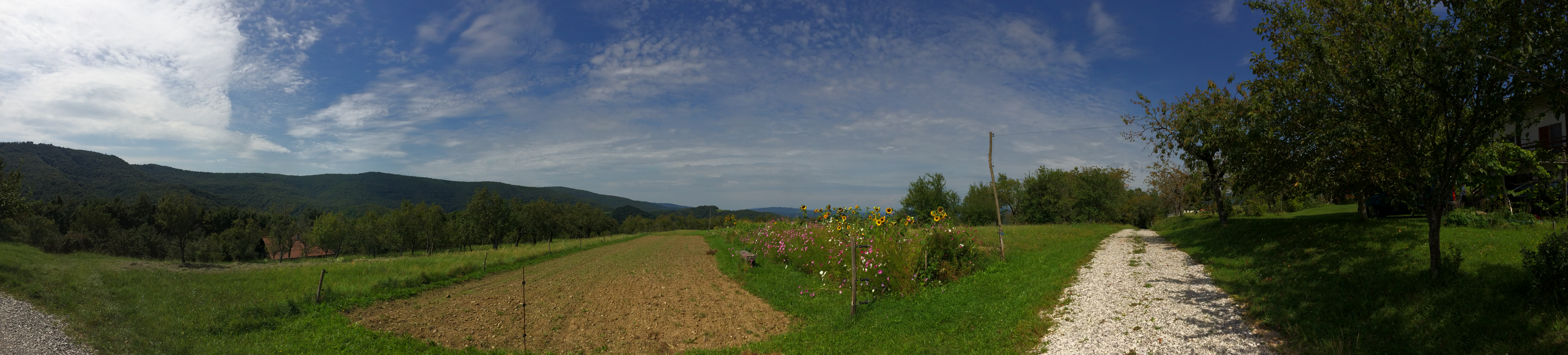
- Vareje panorama

- Location in Slovenia
- Coordinates: 45°37′39.75″N 14°1′53.63″E
- Country: Slovenia
- Traditional region: Littoral
- Statistical region: Coastal–Karst
- Municipality: Divača

Area
  - Total: 3.11 km^{2} (1.20 sq mi)
- Elevation: 633.1 m (2,077 ft)

Population (2020)
  - Total: 34
  - Density: 11/km^{2} (28/sq mi)

Vareje (pronounced [ʋaˈɾɛːjɛ]; Italian: Varèa) is a small settlement in the Municipality of Divača in the Littoral region of Slovenia.
