= Misliče =

- Village
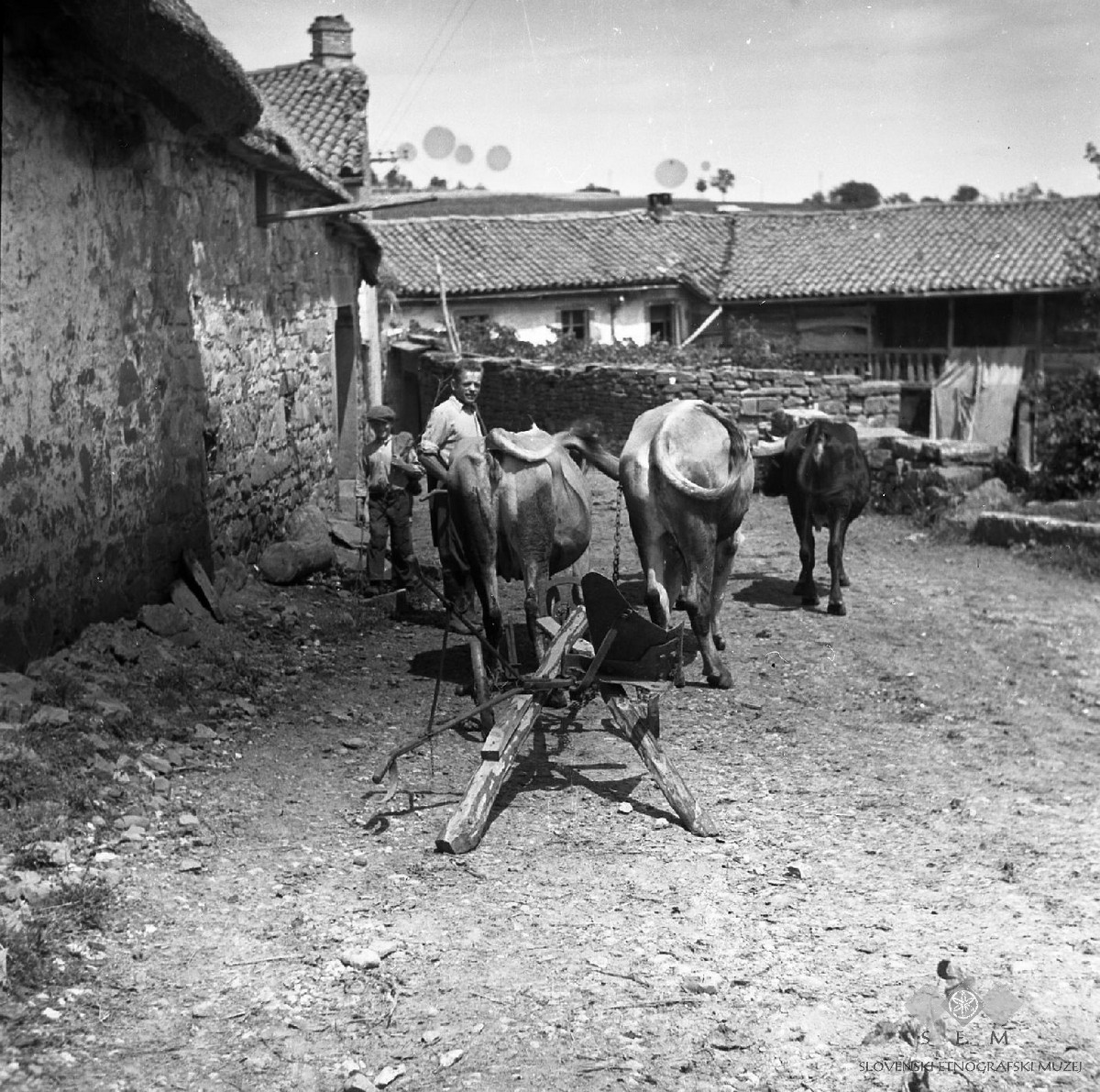
- Misliče in 1955

- Location in Slovenia
- Coordinates: 45°37′24.3″N 14°2′44.22″E
- Country: Slovenia
- Traditional region: Littoral
- Statistical region: Coastal–Karst
- Municipality: Divača

Area
  - Total: 2.54 km^{2} (0.98 sq mi)
- Elevation: 627.1 m (2,057 ft)

Population (2020)
  - Total: 29
  - Density: 11/km^{2} (30/sq mi)

Misliče (pronounced [ˈmiːslitʃɛ]) is a small village above Artviže in the Municipality of Divača in the Littoral region of Slovenia.
