= Gradišče pri Divači =

- Location in Slovenia
- Coordinates: 45°40′22.74″N 13°59′29.89″E
- Country: Slovenia
- Traditional region: Littoral
- Statistical region: Coastal–Karst
- Municipality: Divača

Area
  - Total: 2.48 km^{2} (0.96 sq mi)
- Elevation: 465.3 m (1,527 ft)

Population (2020)
  - Total: 16
  - Density: 6.5/km^{2} (17/sq mi)

Gradišče pri Divači (pronounced [ɡɾaˈdiːʃtʃɛ pɾi diˈʋaːtʃi]) is a small settlement in the Municipality of Divača in the Littoral region of Slovenia.

== Name ==
The name of the settlement was changed from Gradišče to Gradišče pri Divači in 1953.

== Church ==
The local church is dedicated to Saint Helena.
