= Famlje =

Famlje Famie
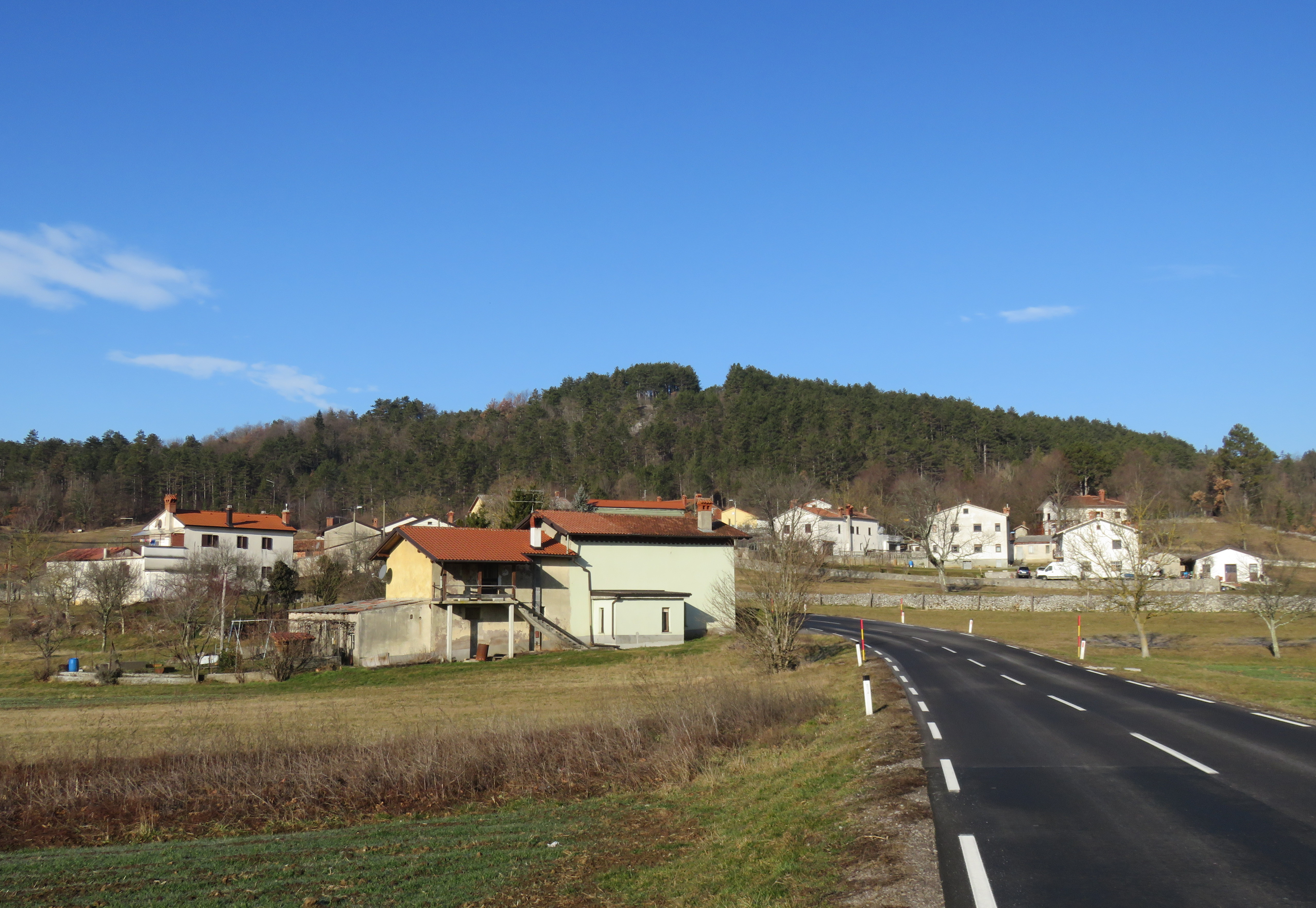

- Location in Slovenia
- Coordinates: 45°39′39.27″N 14°1′14.62″E
- Country: Slovenia
- Traditional region: Littoral
- Statistical region: Coastal–Karst
- Municipality: Divača

Area
  - Total: 1.34 km^{2} (0.52 sq mi)
- Elevation: 364.7 m (1,197 ft)

Population (2020)
  - Total: 147
  - Density: 110/km^{2} (284/sq mi)

Famlje (pronounced [ˈfaːmljɛ]; Italian: Famie) is a village in the Municipality of Divača in the Littoral region of Slovenia.

== Church ==
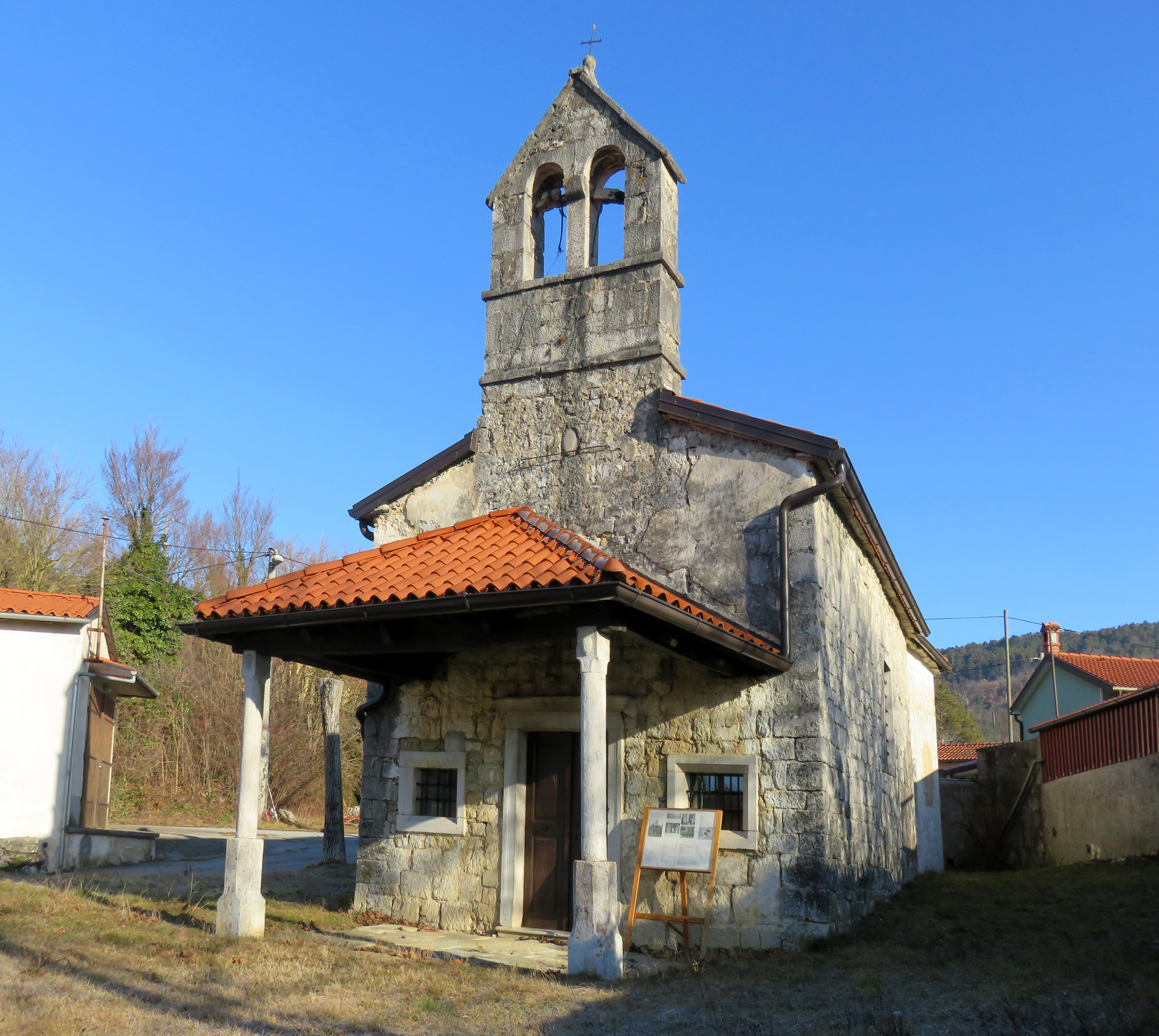
Saint Thomas's Church

The local church is dedicated to Saint Thomas and belongs to the Parish of Vreme.
