= Dolnje Ležeče =

Dolnje Ležeče Lesecce di San Canziano
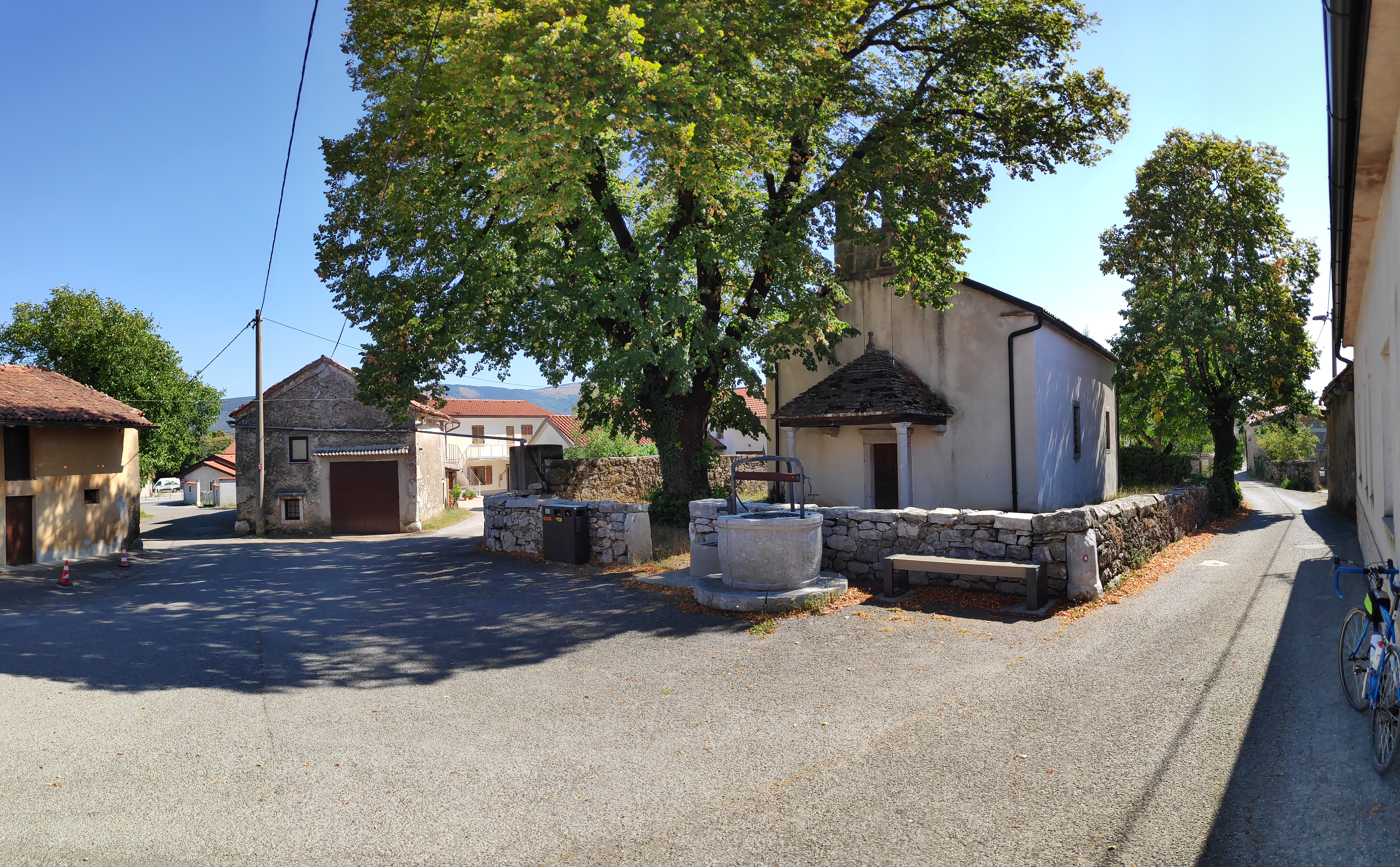

- Location in Slovenia
- Coordinates: 45°40′39.9″N 13°58′52.15″E
- Country: Slovenia
- Traditional region: Littoral
- Statistical region: Coastal–Karst
- Municipality: Divača

Area
  - Total: 4.86 km^{2} (1.88 sq mi)
- Elevation: 449.5 m (1,475 ft)

Population (2020)
  - Total: 230
  - Density: 47/km^{2} (120/sq mi)

Dolnje Ležeče (pronounced [ˈdoːlnjɛ lɛˈʒeːtʃɛ]; Italian: Lesecce di San Canziano) is a settlement next to Divača in the Littoral region of Slovenia.

The local church is dedicated to the Holy Trinity and belongs to the Parish of Divača.
