= Kačiče-Pared =

Kačiče–Pared
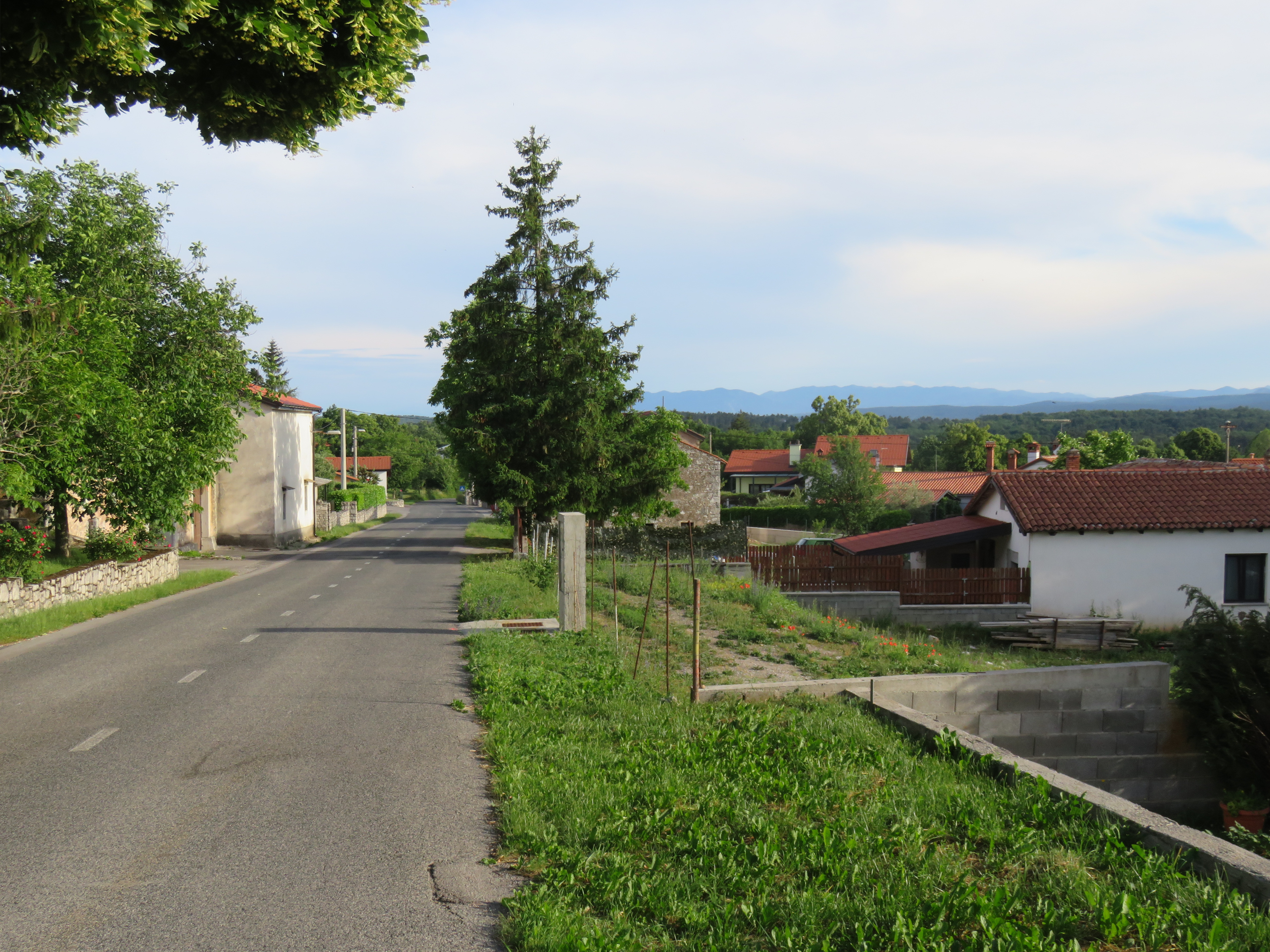

- Location in Slovenia
- Coordinates: 45°38′36.38″N 13°58′4.51″E
- Country: Slovenia
- Traditional region: Littoral
- Statistical region: Coastal-Karst
- Municipality: Divača

Area
  - Total: 5.33 km^{2} (2.06 sq mi)
- Elevation: 490 m (1,610 ft)

Population (2020)
  - Total: 121
  - Density: 22.7/km^{2} (58.8/sq mi)

Kačiče–Pared (pronounced [kaˈtʃiːtʃɛ paˈɾeːt]) is a settlement in the Municipality of Divača in the Littoral region of Slovenia.

== Geography ==
Gallows Cave (Slovene: Pod gavgah) lies northwest of the settlement. In the mid-20th century older residents recalled finding beams set up in the rock near the cave reputed to be gallows dating back to French rule under the Illyrian Provinces. Gallows were also erected at the site by Count Petazzi.

== Name ==
The name of the settlement was changed from Kačiče to Kačiče–Pared in 1952.

== Church ==
The local church is dedicated to the Nativity of Mary and belongs to the Parish of Rodik.
