= Vatovlje =

- Village
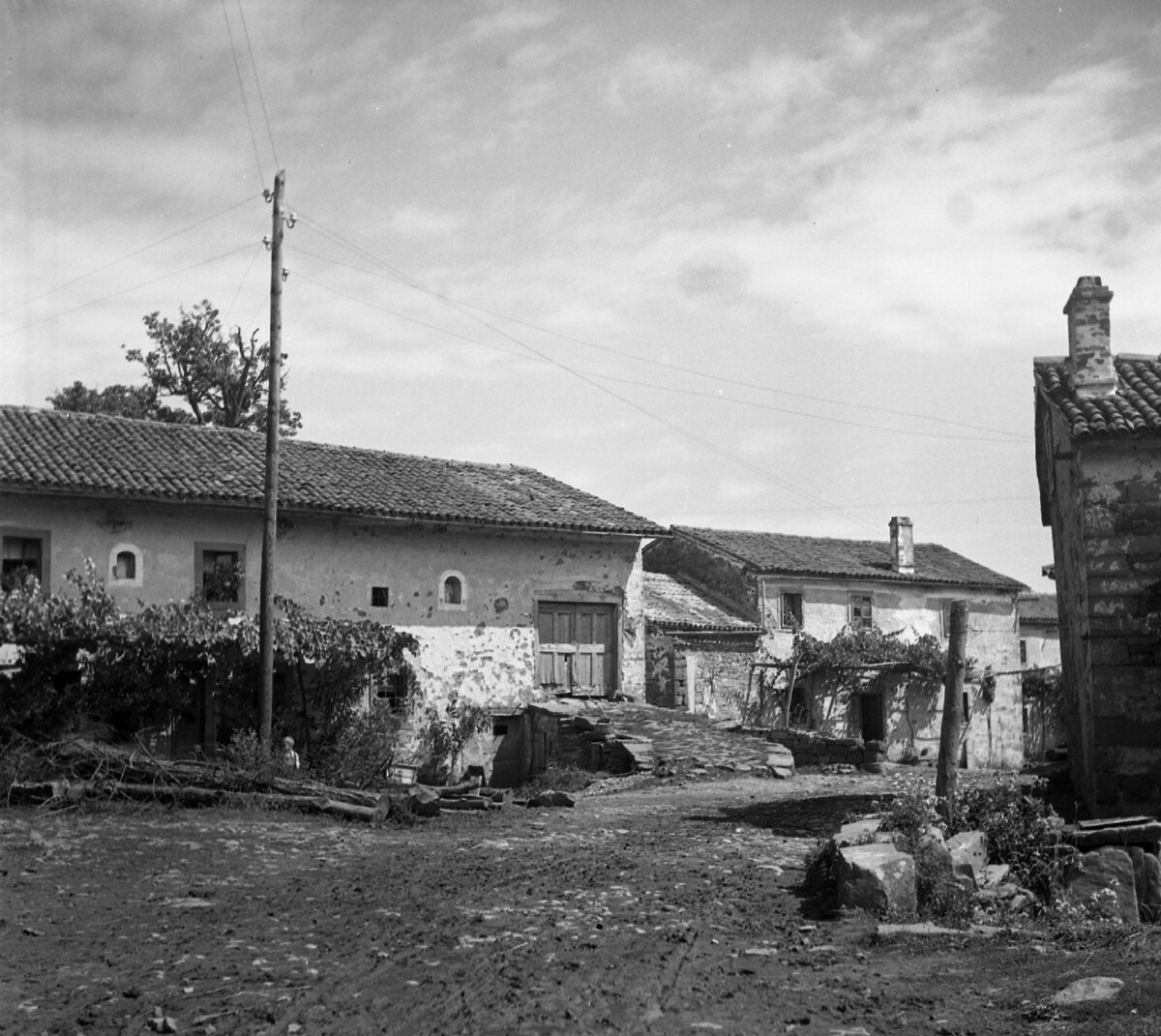
- Vatovlje in 1955

- Location in Slovenia
- Coordinates: 45°37′23.16″N 14°3′42.41″E
- Country: Slovenia
- Traditional region: Littoral
- Statistical region: Coastal–Karst
- Municipality: Divača

Area
  - Total: 1.74 km^{2} (0.67 sq mi)
- Elevation: 621.2 m (2,038 ft)

Population (2020)
  - Total: 17
  - Density: 9.8/km^{2} (25/sq mi)

Vatovlje (pronounced [ˈʋaːtɔu̯ljɛ]) is a small village in the Municipality of Divača in the Littoral region of Slovenia.

The parish church built just outside the settlement is dedicated to Saint George and belongs to the Koper Diocese.
