= Dolnje Vreme =

Dolnje Vreme Auremo di Sotto
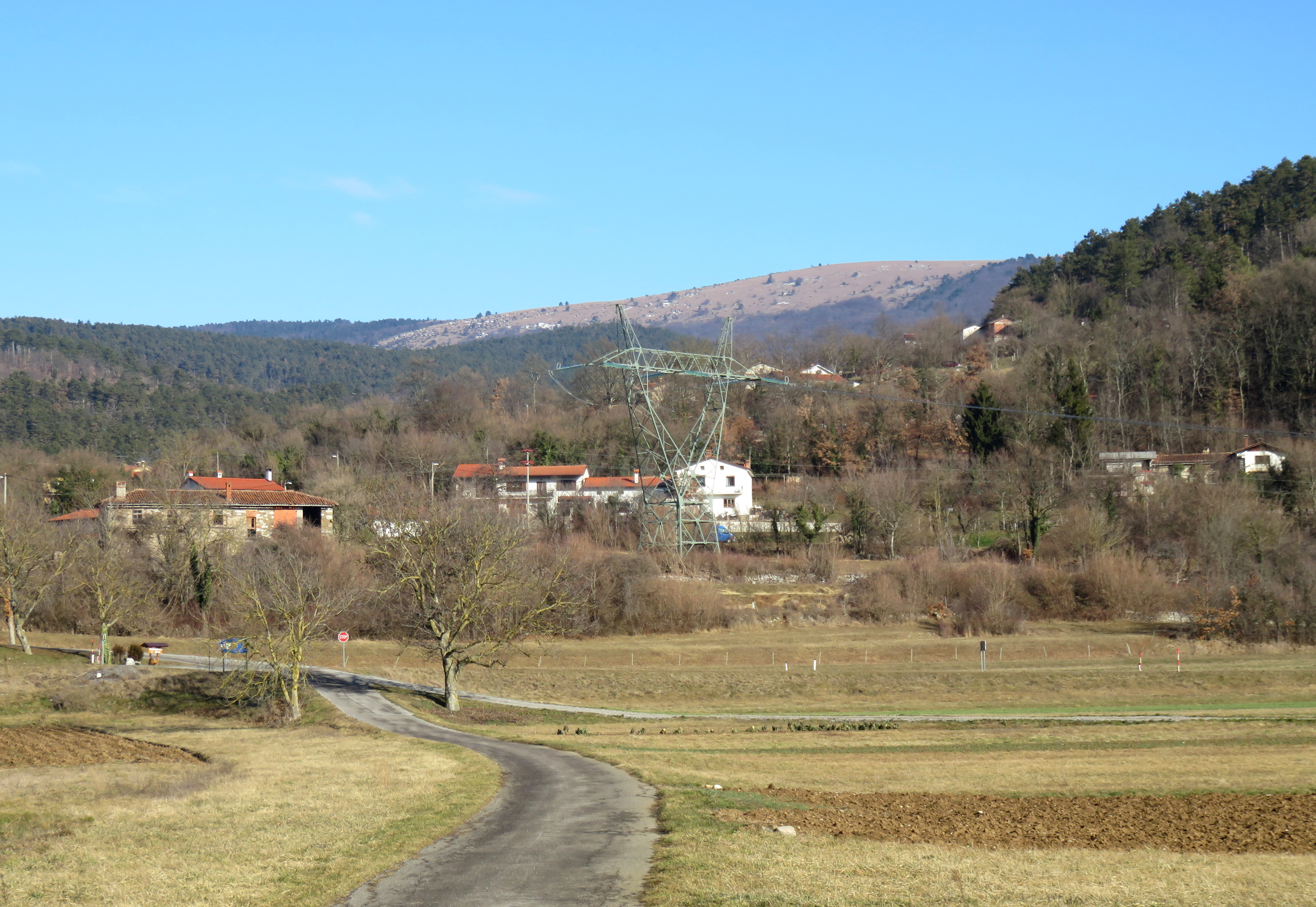

- Location in Slovenia
- Coordinates: 45°39′33.29″N 14°2′12.93″E
- Country: Slovenia
- Traditional region: Inner Carniola
- Statistical region: Coastal–Karst
- Municipality: Divača

Area
  - Total: 5.85 km^{2} (2.26 sq mi)
- Elevation: 433.6 m (1,423 ft)

Population (2020)
  - Total: 117
  - Density: 20.0/km^{2} (51.8/sq mi)

Dolnje Vreme (pronounced [ˈdoːlnjɛ ˈwɾeːmɛ], German: Unterurem, Italian: Auremo di Sotto) is a village in the Municipality of Divača in the Littoral region of Slovenia.
