= Škoflje, Divača =

Škoflje Scoffe
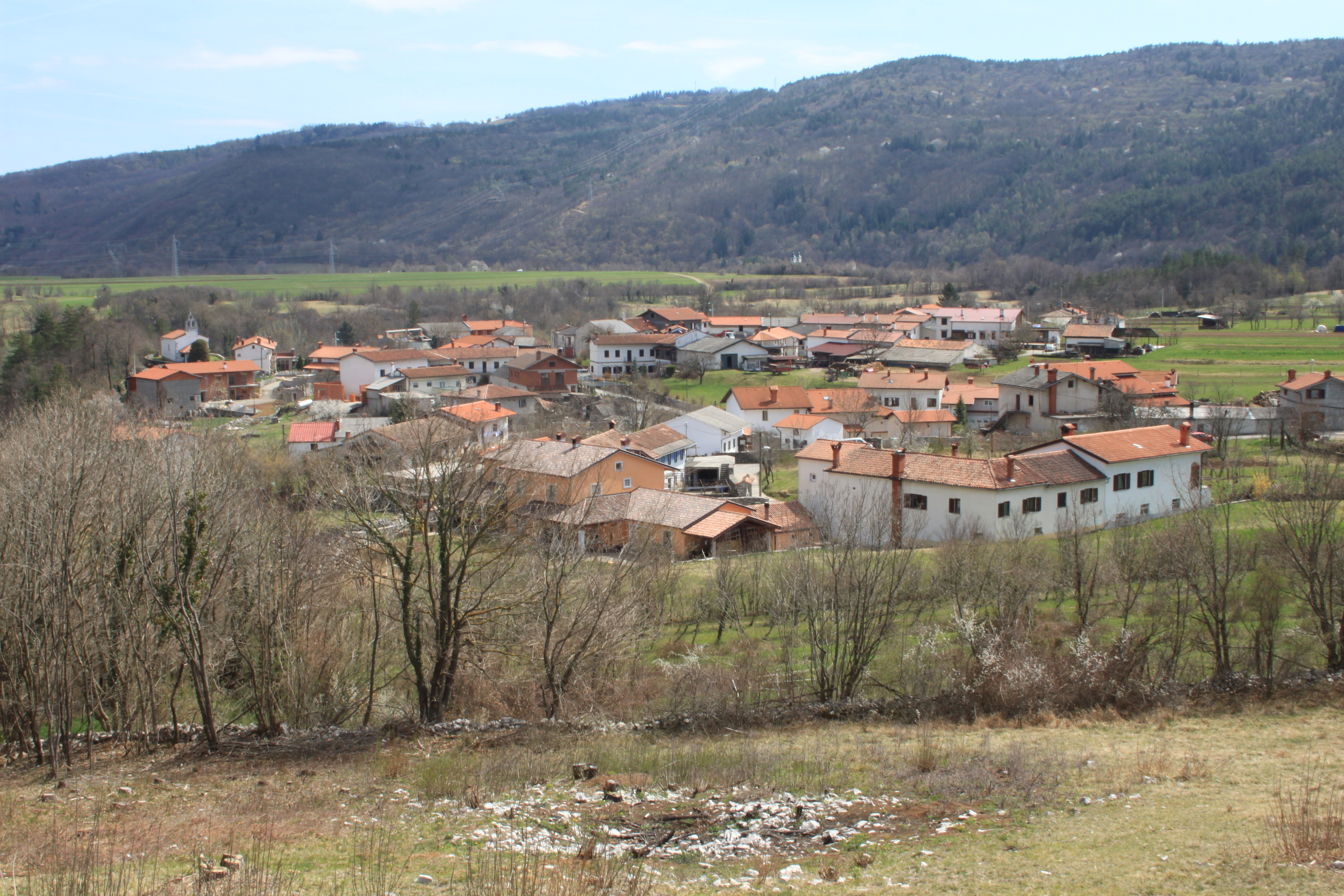

- Location in Slovenia
- Coordinates: 45°39′18.97″N 14°1′26.52″E
- Country: Slovenia
- Traditional region: Littoral
- Statistical region: Coastal–Karst
- Municipality: Divača

Area
  - Total: 0.65 km^{2} (0.25 sq mi)
- Elevation: 360.6 m (1,183 ft)

Population (2020)
  - Total: 107
  - Density: 160/km^{2} (430/sq mi)

Škoflje (pronounced [ˈʃkoːfljɛ]; Italian: Scoffe) is a village on the Reka River in the Municipality of Divača in the Littoral region of Slovenia.

== Church ==
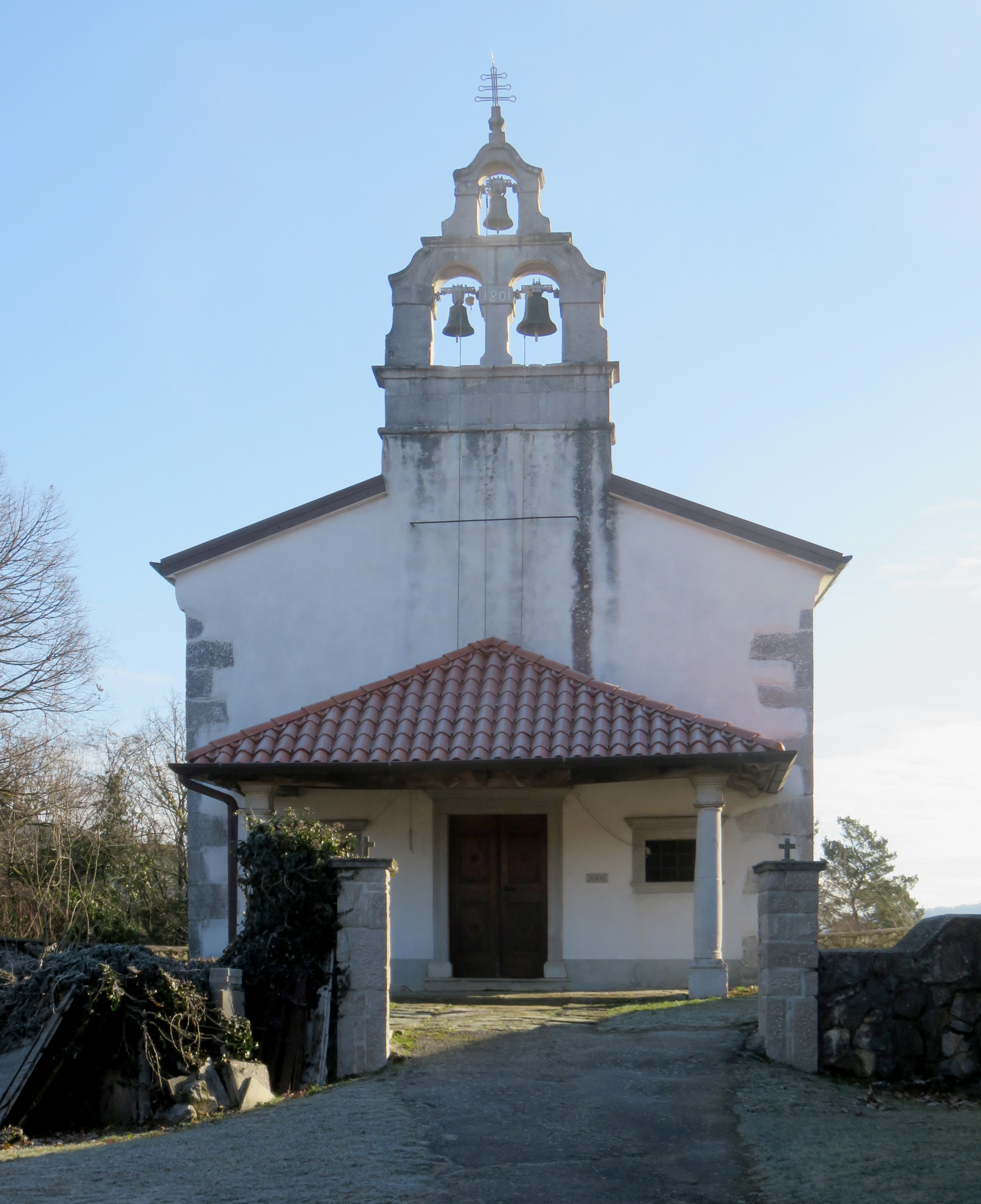
Holy Cross Church

The church in Škoflje is dedicated to the Holy Cross. It is a Baroque structure that was remodeled in the 19th century. The church has a square nave and a chancel terminating in a flat wall, and there is a bell gable above the entry on the west side of the church. The church has a Baroque altar with an 1862 painting depicting the Finding of the True Cross by Pavel Künl (1817–1871).
