= Vremski Britof =

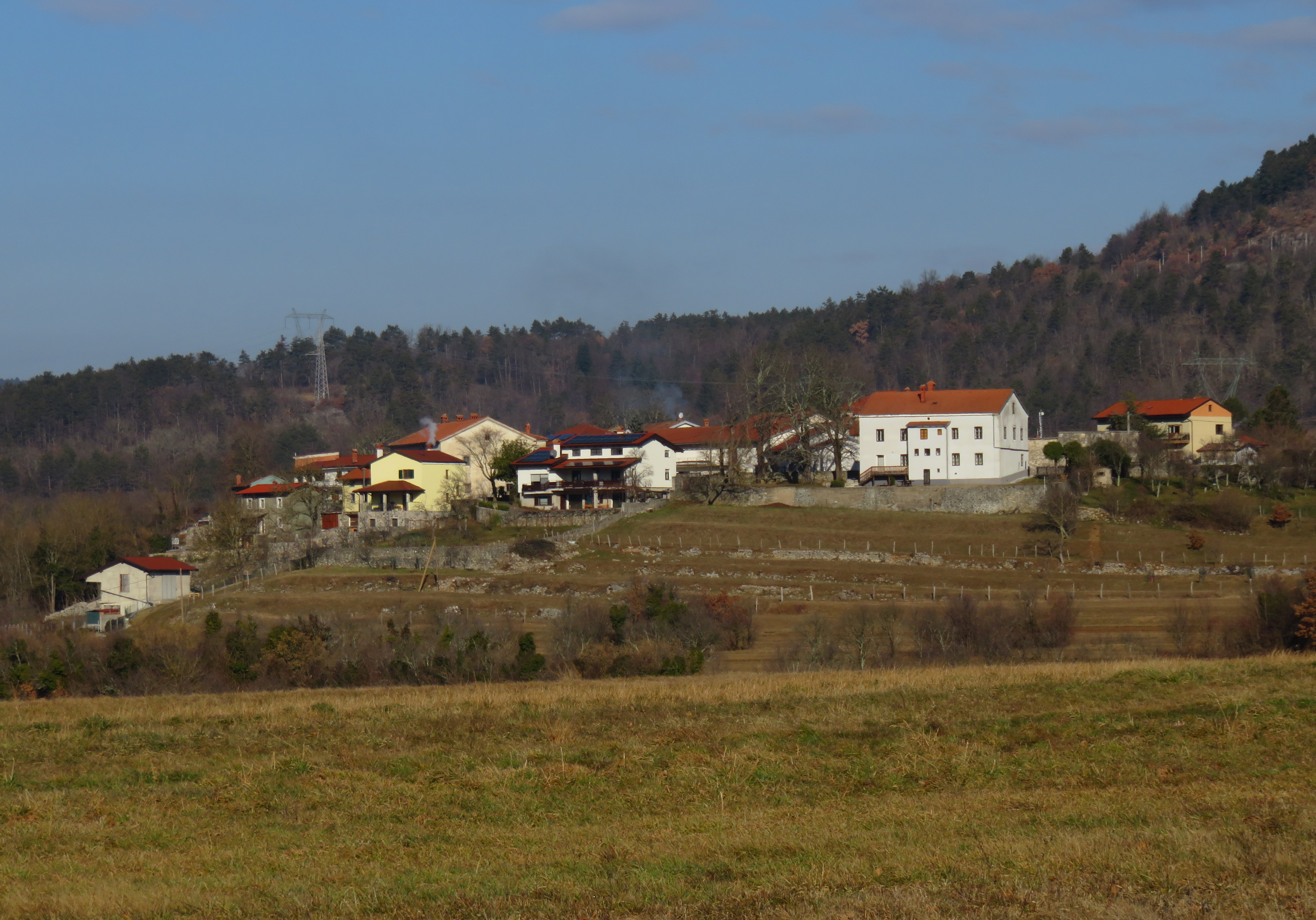

- Location in Slovenia
- Coordinates: 45°39′23″N 14°1′49″E
- Country: Slovenia
- Traditional region: Inner Carniola
- Statistical region: Coastal–Karst
- Municipality: Divača

Area
  - Total: 0.75 km^{2} (0.29 sq mi)
- Elevation: 377 m (1,237 ft)

Population (2020)
  - Total: 54
  - Density: 72/km^{2} (190/sq mi)

Vremski Britof (pronounced [ˈwɾeːmski ˈbɾiːtɔf], formerly simply Britof, Italian: Cave Auremiane) is a village on an elevation above the banks of the Reka River in the Municipality of Divača in the Littoral region of Slovenia.

== Name ==
The name Vremski Britof means 'Britof near Vreme', distinguishing the settlement from others named Britof. The name Britof is derived from the Slovene common noun britof 'cultivated fenced area'. This was borrowed from Middle High German vrîthof, also meaning 'cultivated fenced area'. The denotation of the common noun in both languages later developed from this original meaning to 'churchyard' and then to 'cemetery'.

== Church ==
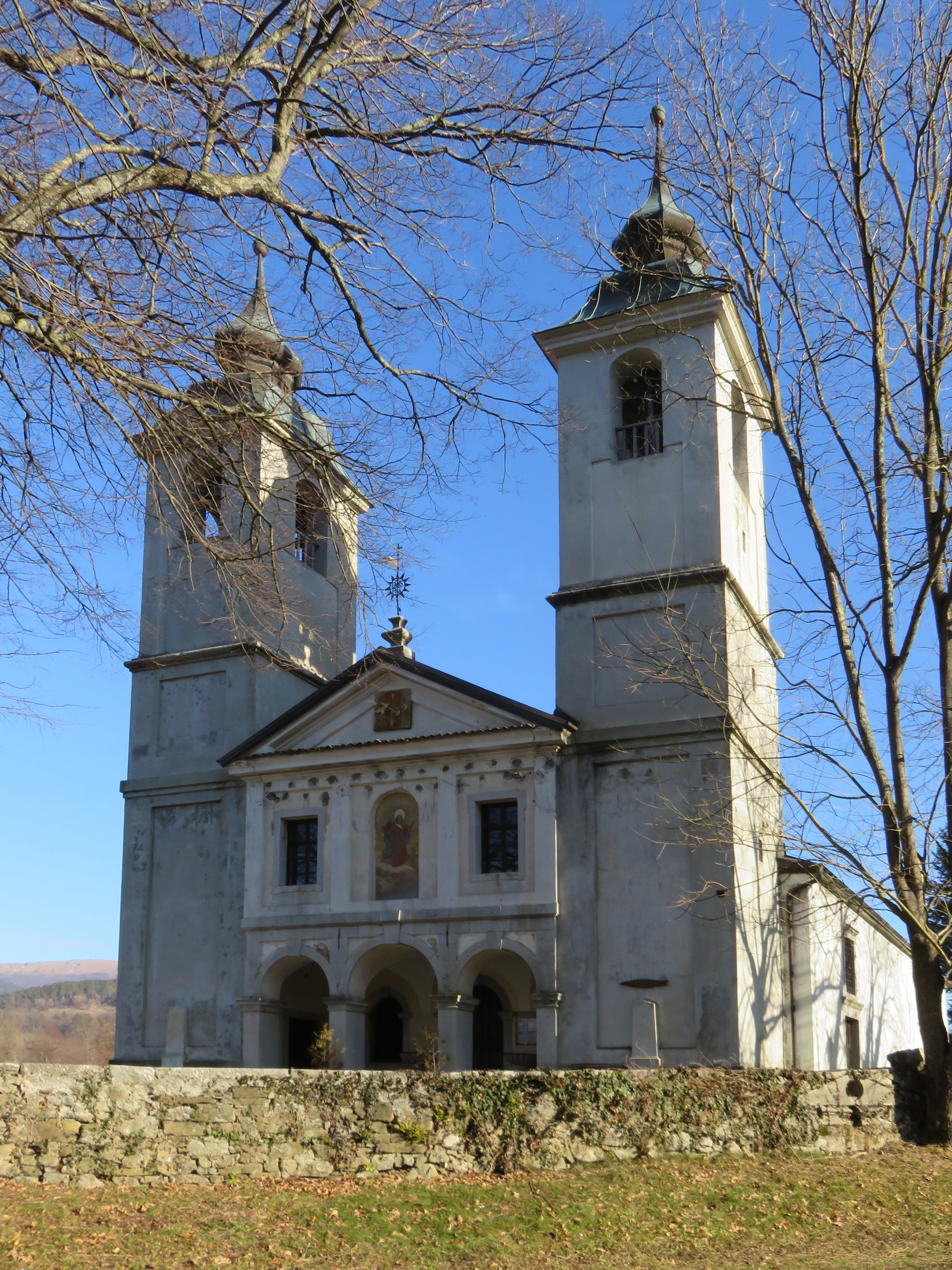
View from the southwest

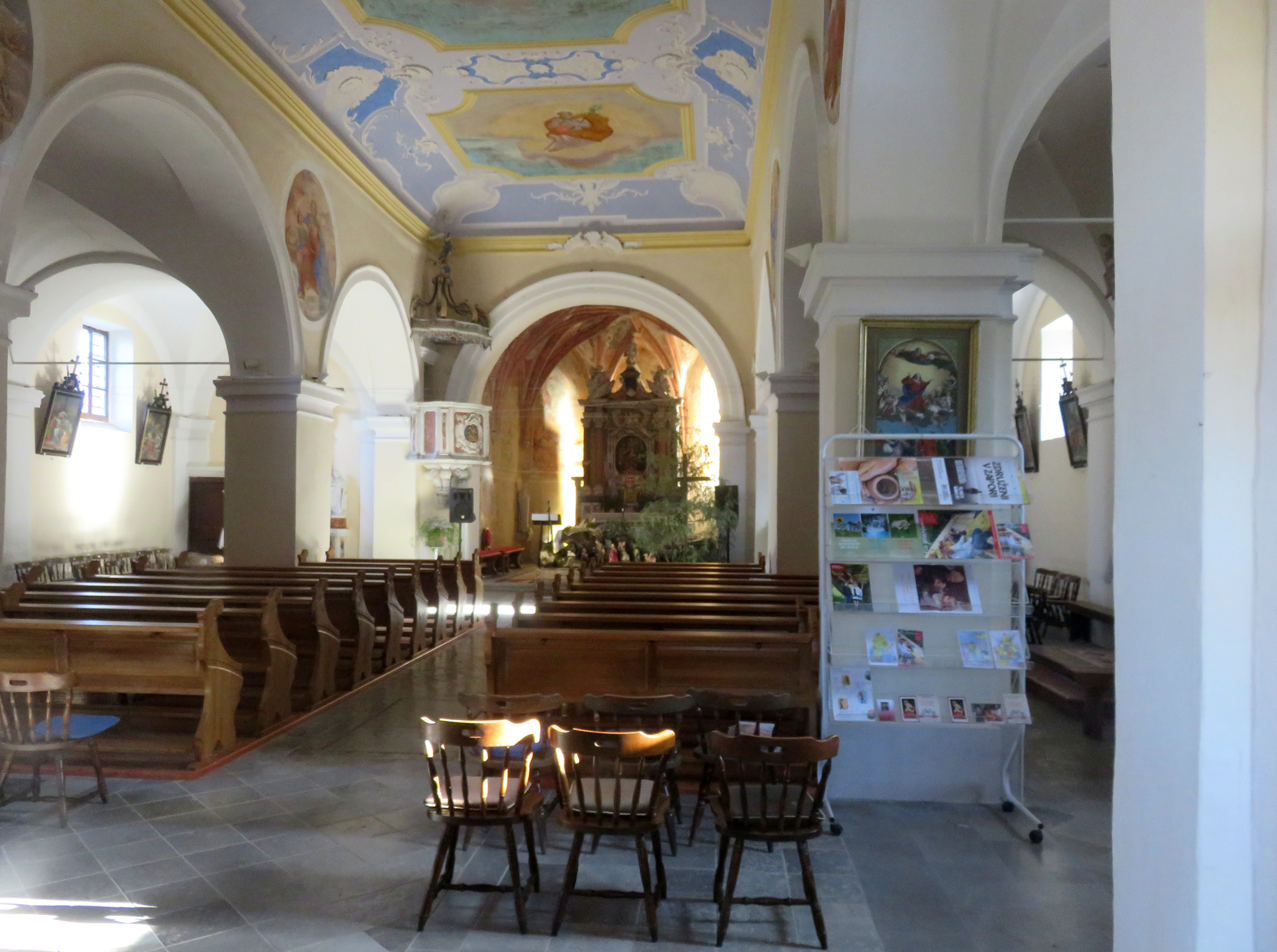
Church interior

Assumption Church

The Vreme parish church, built south of the settlement, is dedicated to the Assumption of Mary and belongs to the Koper Diocese.
