= Matavun =

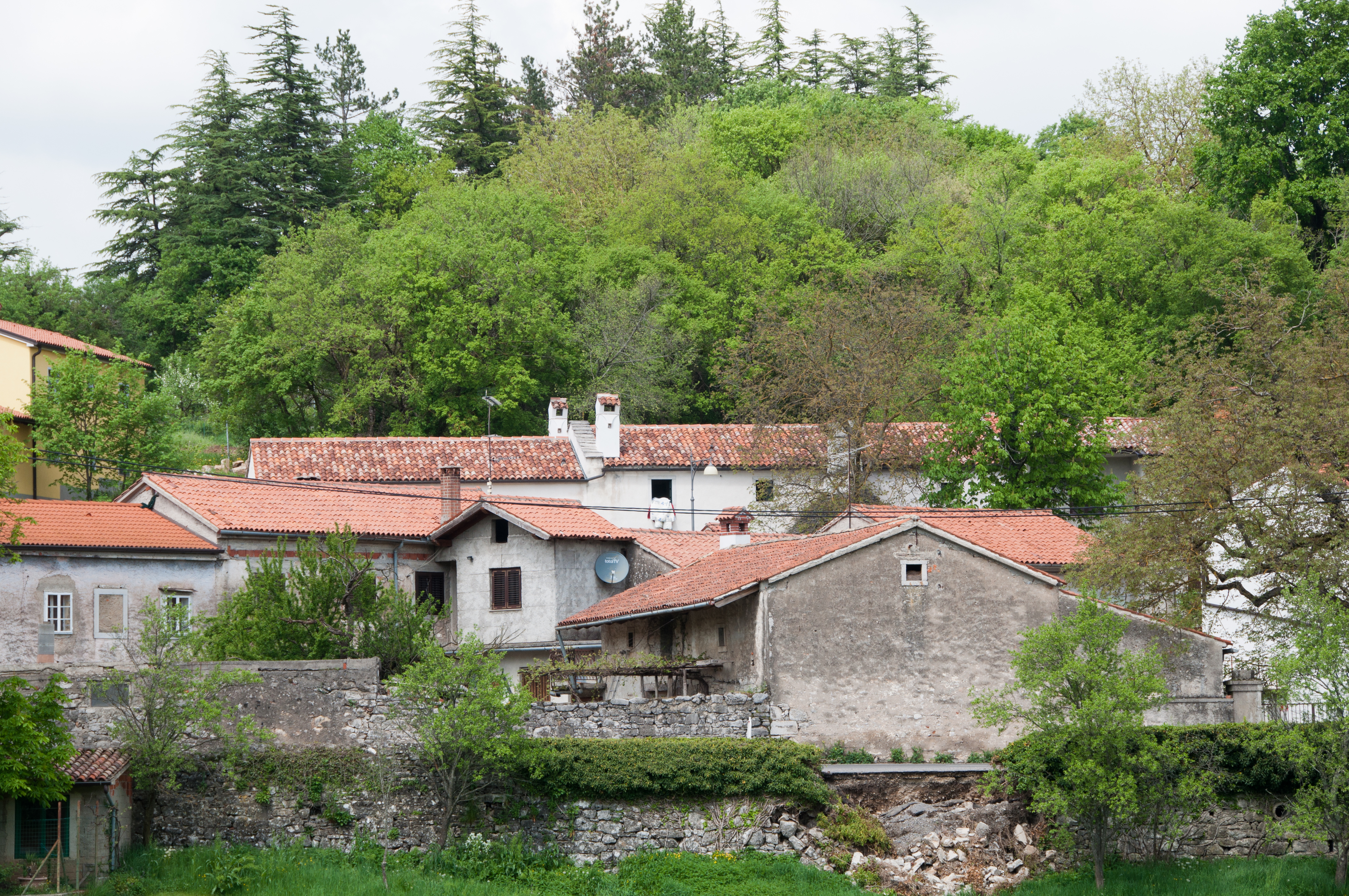

- Location in Slovenia
- Coordinates: 45°39′46.43″N 13°59′26.39″E
- Country: Slovenia
- Traditional region: Littoral
- Statistical region: Coastal–Karst
- Municipality: Divača

Area
  - Total: 2.68 km^{2} (1.03 sq mi)
- Elevation: 401.5 m (1,317 ft)

Population (2020)
  - Total: 50
  - Density: 19/km^{2} (48/sq mi)

Matavun (pronounced [mataˈʋuːn]) is a settlement near the entrance to Škocjan Caves in the Municipality of Divača in the Littoral region of Slovenia.
