= Senožeče =

Senožeče Senosècchia
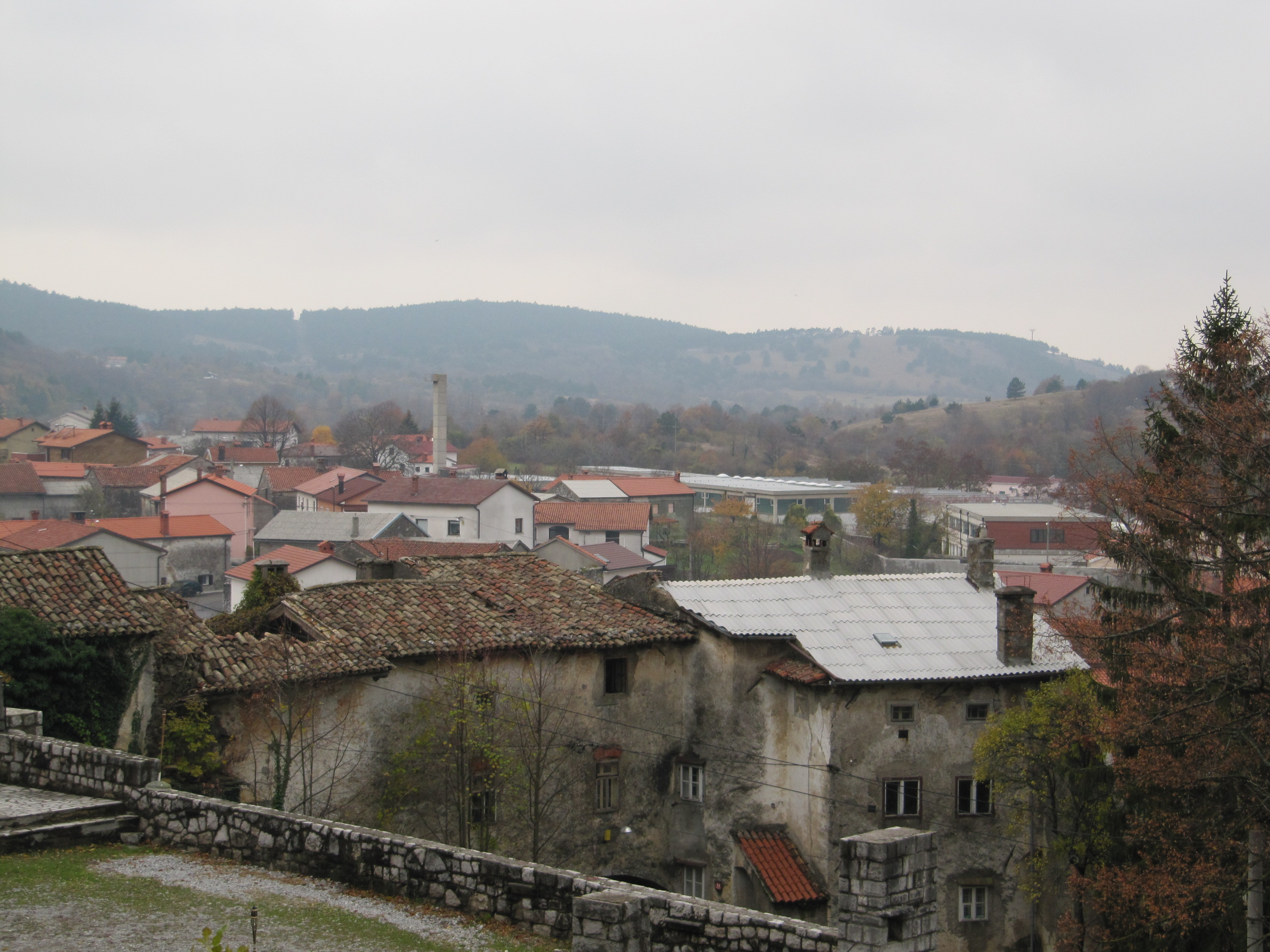

- Location in Slovenia
- Coordinates: 45°43′7.17″N 14°2′22.21″E
- Country: Slovenia
- Traditional region: Littoral
- Statistical region: Coastal–Karst
- Municipality: Divača

Area
  - Total: 19.63 km^{2} (7.58 sq mi)
- Elevation: 573 m (1,880 ft)

Population (2020)
  - Total: 616
  - Density: 31.4/km^{2} (81.3/sq mi)

Senožeče (pronounced [sɛnɔˈʒeːtʃɛ]; Italian: Senosecchia, German: Senosetsch) is a settlement in the Municipality of Divača in the Littoral region of Slovenia.

== Name ==
Senožeče was attested in historical sources as Sehenossecsch in 1217, Senosensach in 1297, and Sinesecha in 1310, among other spellings. The name is derived from the plural demonym *Sěnožęťani 'residents of a hayfield or meadow' (from the common noun *sěnožętъ '(mountain) meadow, meadow mown once a year').

== Church ==
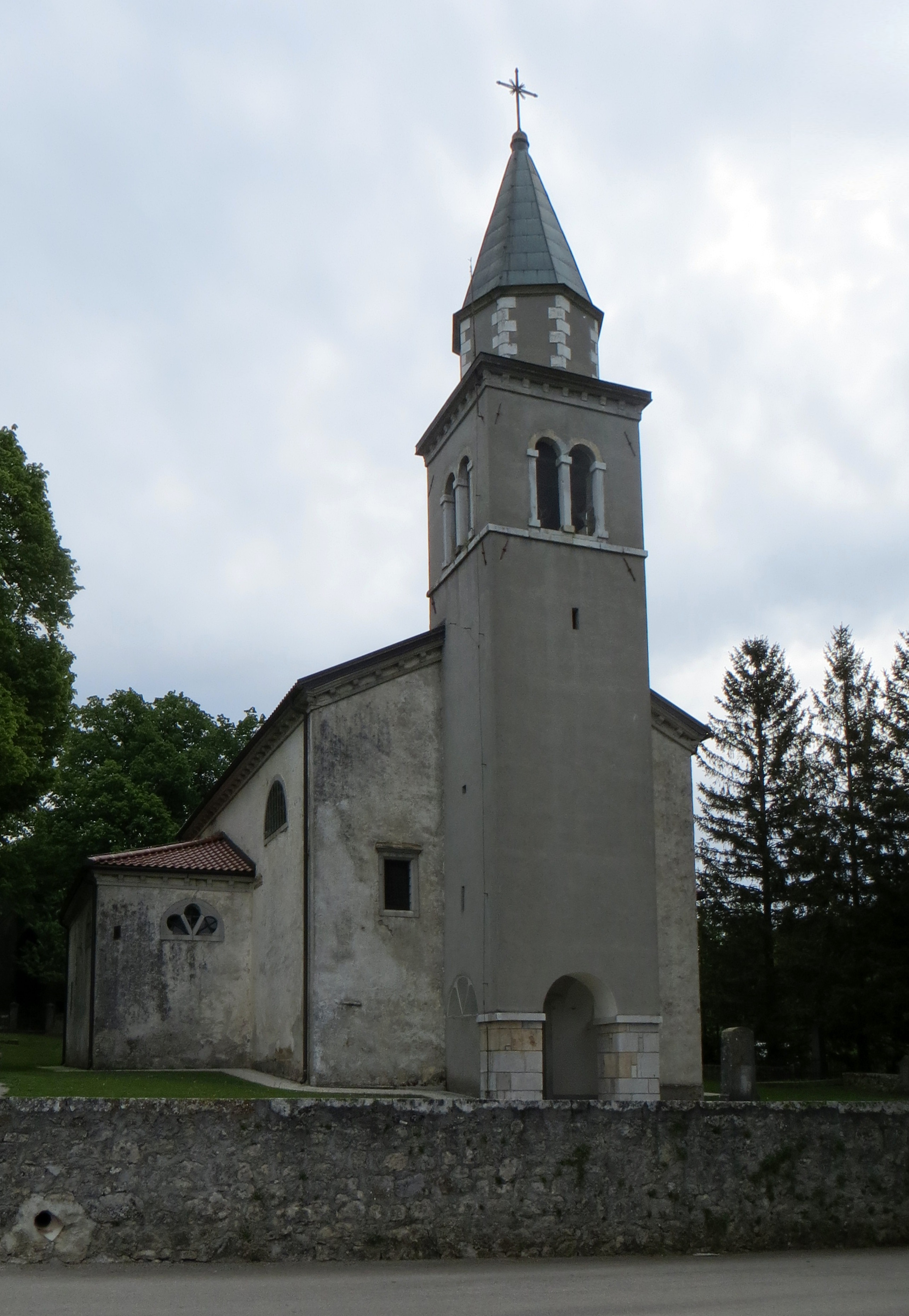
Saint Bartholomew's Church

The parish church in the settlement is dedicated to Saint Bartholomew and belongs to the Koper Diocese.

== Notable people ==
Senožeče is the birthplace of the Olympic fencer Rudolf Cvetko and the anti-Fascist insurgent leader Danilo Zelen.
