= Forehand (disambiguation) =

The forehand in tennis and other racket sports such as table tennis, squash and badminton is a shot made by swinging the racket across one's body with the hand moving palm-first.

Forehand may also refer to:

People

- A. C. and Mamie Forehand, American gospel musicians active in 1927
- Edward "Little Buster" Forehand (1942–2006), American soul and blues musician
- Jennie M. Forehand (1935–2023), American politician in Maryland
- Joe Forehand (born before 1971), American businessman
- Rex Forehand (born 1945), American psychologist

Other

- Forehand (horse), the front half of a horse's body
  - Turn on the forehand, a lateral movement in equestrian schooling

== See also ==
- Forehand & Wadsworth, a U.S. firearms manufacturing company
