= Turn on the haunches =

Lateral horse movement

The turn of the haunches is a lateral movement performed at the halt and walk, used in horse training. It requires the horse, while bent in the direction of the turn, to move his forehand around his hindquarters so that he makes a very small circle with the inside foreleg. The horse should pivot around a hind-leg, as seen in the spin. Additionally, the horse should continue to display basic requirements of dressage, such as an even and regular rhythm, relaxation, acceptance of the aids, balance, and freedom of movement.

== Uses ==
The main purpose of the turn on the haunches is to introduce collection to the horse, as a movement to build collection, and as a stepping stone to the move advanced pirouette. It may also be used as a training movement to help with other problems, such as transitions into the canter, when used right before the transition. For the dressage horse, the movement is first asked for in the second level tests.

The turn on the haunches is also important for jumping horses, before beginning the more difficult rollback turns.

For the rider, the turn on the haunches can teach coordination of aids, as the rider must balance both the driving and restraining aids, as well as maintain the correct bend using the inside leg pushing into the outside aids.

== Asking for the turn ==
The turn on the haunches is usually performed as a turn that is 90 (quarter turn), 180 (half turn), or 360 degrees (full turn), although as a training movement to improve other work, the rider may adjust the number of steps as needed. Before asking for the movement, the horse should be forward and on the bit, maintaining rhythm and relaxation.

When first introducing the turn to horse and rider, the aim should not be to perform it on the spot, but simply to maintain the rhythm of the walk and correct bend while keeping the horse active with his hind legs. Additionally, the rider should first begin with a few steps, such as on a quarter turn, rather than asking for a full 360 degrees right away. If the rider asks for too much too soon, it is likely that the horse will begin to lose important qualities as the turn proceeds, such as rhythm, bend, or activity behind. The rider should never sacrifice quality for quantity.

To ask for the turn on the haunches, the rider must coordinate several aids at once. The outside leg prevents the hindquarters from swinging out, the outside rein maintains a correct bend to the inside, and helps to regulate the driving aids, telling the horse to turn rather than walk forward. The inside leg asks the horse to bend to the inside, pushes the energy into the outside aids, and keeps the activity of the hindquarters. The inside seatbone should be engaged, again to ask the horse to bend in the direction of the turn, and the inside rein should help lead the forehand around and also remind the horse to bend in the direction of the turn.

== Problems ==
Common problems with the turn on the haunches include pivoting on one leg, backing through the turn (it is a much lesser sin for the horse to be moving slightly forward and make a wider circle), and loss of rhythm, as well as an incorrect turn (such as doing a turn on the forehand or a turn on the center if the rider allows the hindquarters to swing out). The horse should also remain straight (i.e. correctly bent) through the turn, rather than overbent in the neck or tilting the head.

If the horse steps backward, the rider should apply more inside leg, and may need to decrease the restraining aids. Horses that make a turn around the center, instead of the hindquarters, do so because the rider did not prevent the hindquarters from swinging out, and therefore more outside leg is needed. Horses that overbend in the neck and pop out the outside shoulder may do so because the rider is trying to pull the horse through the turn using the inside rein, rather than using the inside leg to keep the energy and the outside aids to push the energy around the circle.

== Variations ==
The turn on the haunches may also be performed in motion at the walk, trot, or canter. In this case, the hind legs produce a small circle. When the movement is made on a half-volte (6 meter circle) it is called a passade. This movement is usually used as a step before the horse is asked for a pirouette, and also to improve turns for jumping courses.
