= Equitation =

Art or practice of horse riding or horsemanship

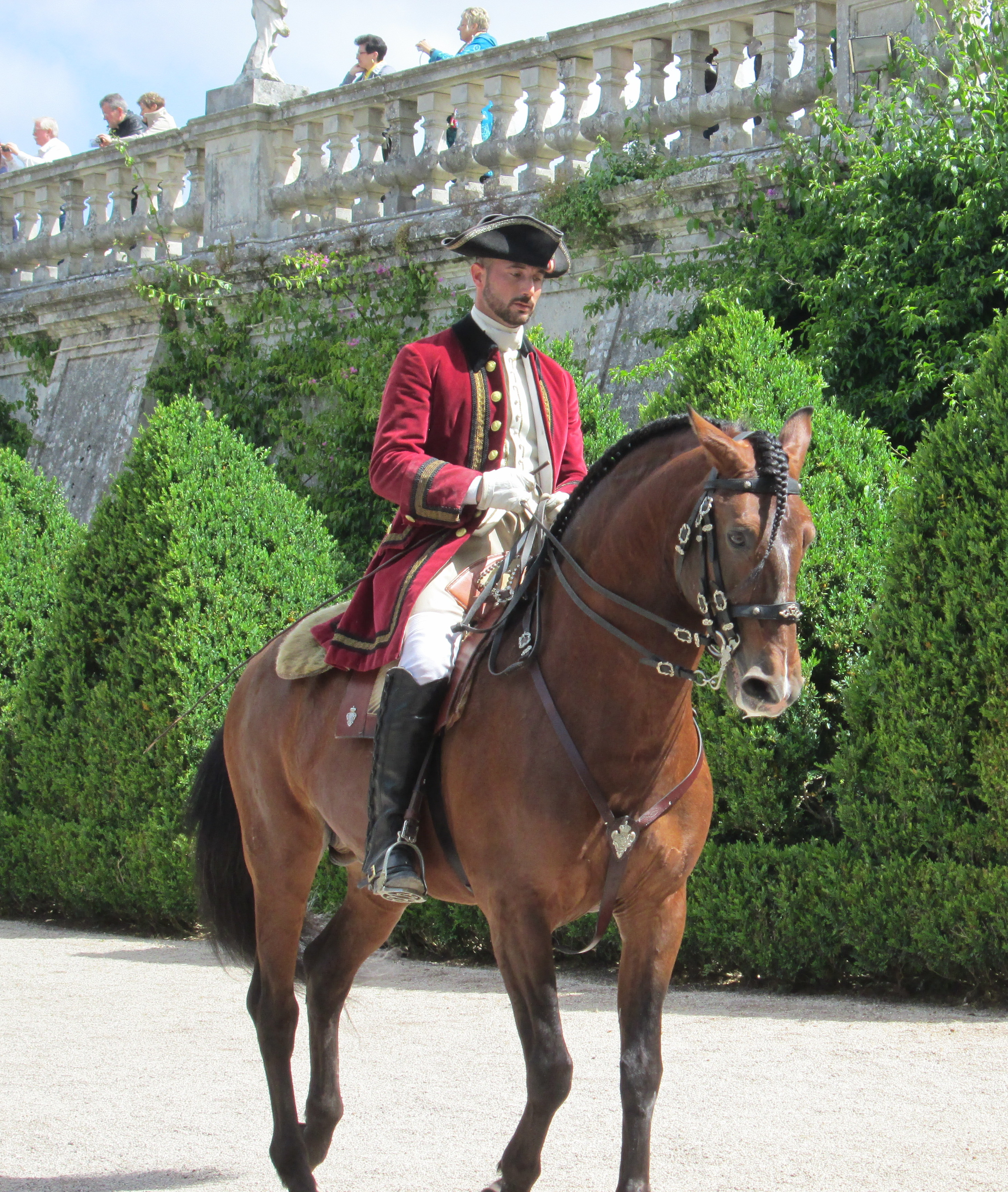
A Lusitano rider of the Portuguese School of Equestrian Art, one of the "Big Four" most prestigious riding academies in the world, alongside the Cadre Noir, the Spanish Riding School, and the Royal Andalusian School

Equitation is the art or practice of horse riding or horsemanship.

More specifically, equitation may refer to a rider's position while mounted, and encompasses a rider's ability to ride correctly and with effective aids. In horse show competition, the rider, rather than the horse is evaluated. Such classes go by different names, depending on region, including equitation classes, rider classes, or horsemanship classes. Judging criteria covers the rider's performance and control of the horse, use of riding aids, proper attire, correct form, and usually factor in rider poise and the cleanliness and polish of horse, rider and equipment. The performance of the horse is not judged per se, but a poorly performing horse is considered to reflect the ability of the rider. Equitation classes occur in the Hunt seat, Saddle seat, Dressage, and Western disciplines. A good equitation rider is always in balance with the horse, maintains a correct position in every gait, movement, or over a fence, and possesses a commanding, but relaxed, presence, able to direct the horse with nearly invisible aids.

== Hunt seat equitation ==
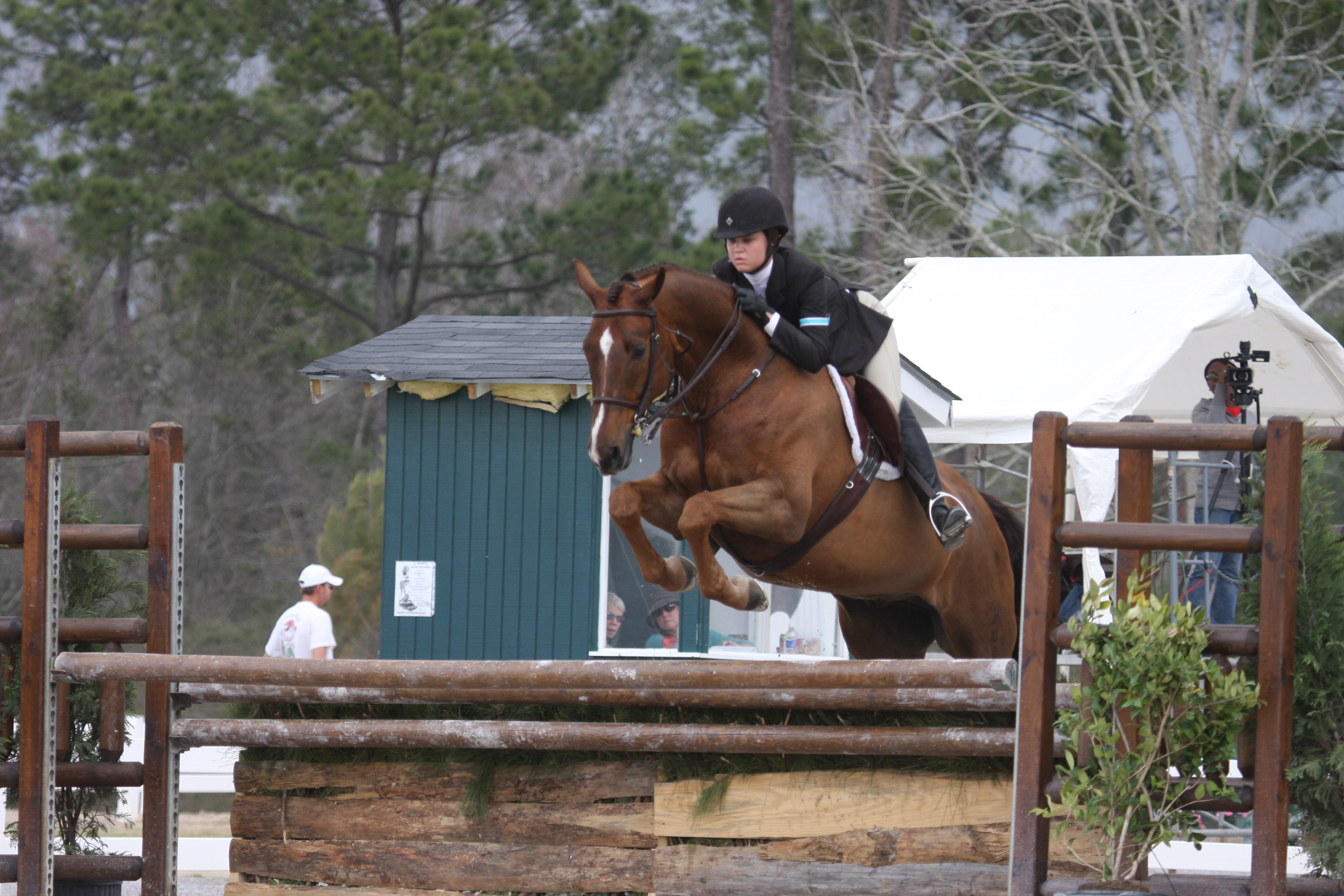
A hunter equitation rider jumping her course.

The hunt seat style of riding is derived from the hunt field.

In equitation competition, flat classes (those that do not including jumping) include judging at the walk, trot, and canter in both directions, and the competitors may be asked to ride without stirrups or perform assorted other tests or patterns. It is correct for the riders to have a light and steady contact with their horse's mouth the entire ride. Incorrect leads, break of pace, and wrong diagonals are penalized. Loss of a stirrup or dropping the reins are also faults, and may be cause for elimination. Bridles and bits permitted in these classes are more traditional hunter-style tack, i.e. snaffles and pelhams along with cavesson nosebands.

In over fences classes (classes in which the horse and rider jump obstacles), the competitor rides over a course of at least six jumps (usually more). Equitation over fence classes rarely have fences higher than 3 feet 6 inches (1.07 m). Classes for more accomplished riders may require at least one flying lead change, and one or more combinations. The rider is judged not only on position and effectiveness of riding aids, but should also maintain an even, forward pace and meet each fence at an appropriate distance. Additional jumper-type tack is permitted including gags and two or three-ring bits as well as flash, drop, and figure eight nosebands. Additionally, if martingales are used, they must be running martingales.

At the highest level of hunt seat equitation in North America are the national ASPCA Maclay Finals, the USET Talent Search Finals, the WIHS Equitation Finals, and USEF Medal classes in the United States, and the CET (Canadian Equestrian Team) Medal and Jump Canada Medal in Canada. These championships and their qualifying classes may include bending lines, roll back turns, narrow fences, and fences with a long approach to test the rider. Fences must be at least 3'6" and may be up to 5' wide, and the course must have at least eight obstacles and at least one combination. The course may include liverpool or open water elements, depending on the class and region specifications. The USET Talent Search Finals always includes an open water element.

Equitation tests may be chosen by the judge to help place the top riders. These tests are required in the medal classes. Tests may include a halt for several seconds, rein back, demonstration of the hand gallop, figure-8 at the trot or canter with correct diagonals or leads (simple change of lead or flying), trotting or cantering low fences (up to 3'), jump obstacles at the walk (up to 2'), jumping fences on a figure-8, oral questions regarding tack, equipment, conformation, and basic horsemanship, riding without stirrups, performing a turn on the forehand or haunches, and a serpentine at the trot or canter with flying changes. Riders may also be asked to switch horses at higher levels of competition, such as at a national final. Switching of horses is no longer common at smaller competitions, usually only championships, due to the risks involved. The Intercollegiate Horse Shows Association (IHSA) welcomes men and women of all levels of riding in both hunter seat equitation, on the flat and over fences and Western horsemanship in a range of programs from varsity to club sports at colleges and universities across the United States and Canada. The National Collegiate Equestrian Association (NCEA) mainly focuses on hunt seat equitation. Riders (women only) wanting to compete in the college division 1 teams need prior knowledge on riding hunt seat equitation to be considered for the teams.

== Saddle seat equitation ==
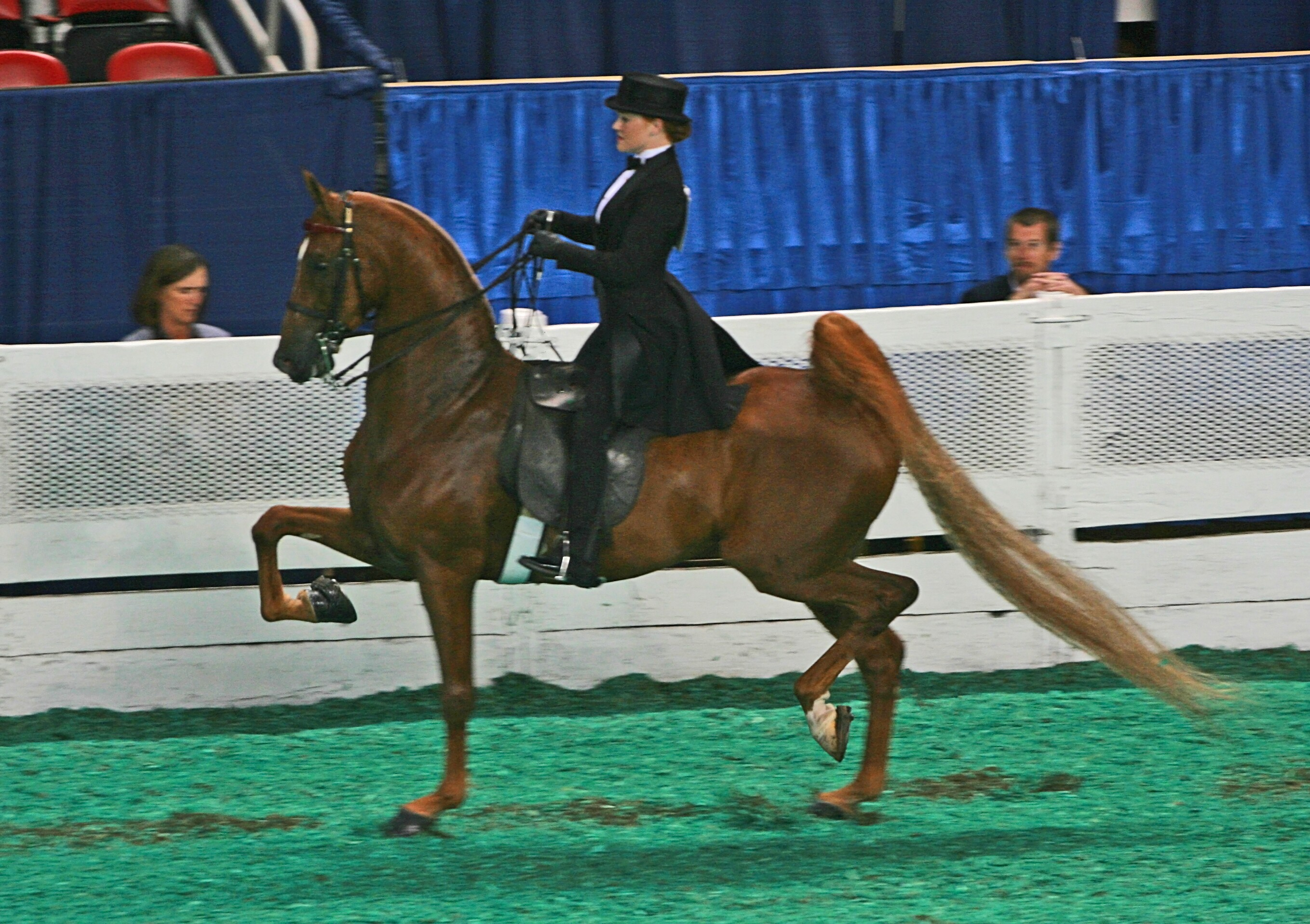
A saddle seat rider on an American Saddlebred.

Saddle seat is a uniquely American form of riding that grew out of a style of riding used on Southern plantations, with some European influences from "Park" or Sunday exhibition riding of high-stepping horses in public venues (often literally, city parks). Today it is seen most often at horse shows organized for exhibitors of the American Saddlebred, Morgan, Arabian, Tennessee Walking Horse, and the National Show Horse. It is also sometimes seen in competition for Andalusian horses. There are open and breed-specific national championships as well as an international championship held every other year.

Gaits shown in Saddle Seat classes include the walk, trot, and canter. Some competitions may call for extended gaits, particularly the trot. When showing a Tennessee Walking Horse they will be required to perform a flat walk and running walk. Some class will also require a canter. All classes require Rail work, where competitors show and are judged as a group going both ways of the arena. Saddle seat equitation may include individual tests or a pattern to be ridden. Tests may include backing up, mounting and dismounting, riding without stirrups, "addressing" the reins (i.e. picking up the four or two reins correctly), figure eights, serpentines and straight line patterns done at any gait. At the canter, only simple changes of lead are required when changing directions. It is possible to have a "ride-off," where two or more riders are asked to perform additional work to determine the winner.

Correct position for the rider is to have the ear, shoulder, hip, and heel in a line. He/she is also to have a straight line from knee to toe, and from elbow to wrist to the horse's bit. The rider's back should be straight yet relaxed, and the legs and arms are to remain virtually motionless.

The informal dress for saddle seat equitation includes a coat and Kentucky jodhpurs of a dark, conservative color, e.g., herringbone, pin stripes, black, blue, grey, dark burgundy, dark green or beige; a white or pastel collared shirt with a tie; derby or soft hat; and jodhpur boots. Vests and gloves are optional. After 6 p.m. formal wear is required. This habit includes a tuxedo-style jacket, pants and vest with bow tie and formal shirt, and top hat.

Pleasure equitation is another form of saddle seat equitation in which a rider is required to wear informal dress (coat, jodhpur pants, derby or soft hat, all in a dark color) in the day and evening and ride a horse that has a full mane and tail which is not set. The horses used are of a less animated style than in open competition, such as a country pleasure horse. The Morgan equivalent of this class is called Classic Saddle Seat Equitation.

The value given to rail work and pattern work varies from qualifying competition to championship competition.

== Western equitation ==
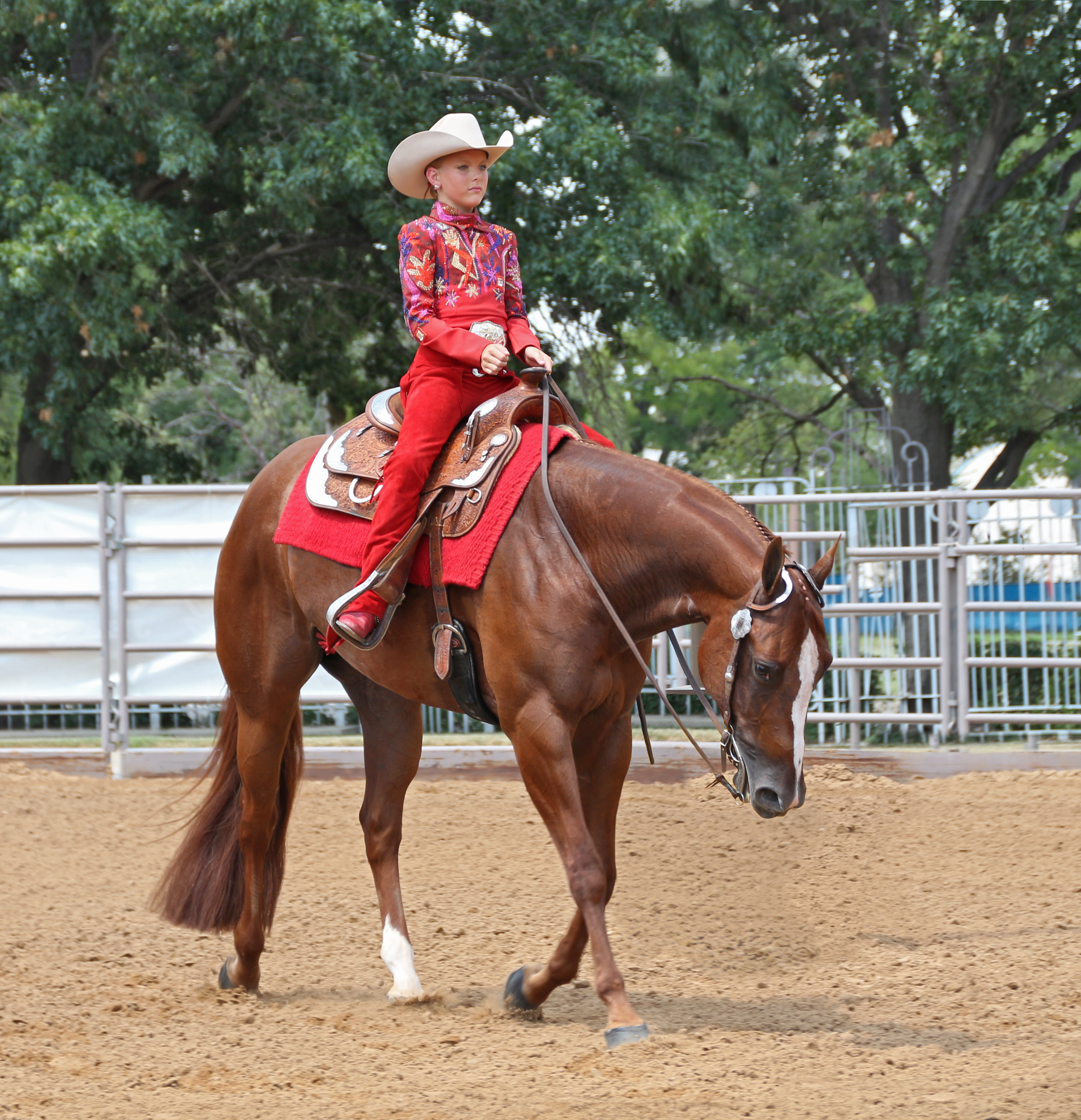
A western equitation rider.

Video of a rider performing a western equitation pattern.

Western equitation (sometimes called Western horsemanship, stock seat equitation, or, in some classes, reining seat equitation) competitions are judged at the walk, jog, and lope in both directions. Some classes require individual patterns. Riders must sit to the jog and never post.

Riders must use a Western saddle and a curb bit, and may only use one hand to hold the reins while riding. Two hands are allowed if the horse is ridden in a snaffle bit or hackamore, which are only permitted for use on younger, "junior" horses, defined differently by various breed associations, but usually referring to horses four or five years of age and younger. Horses are not allowed to wear a noseband or cavesson, nor any type of protective boot or bandage, except during some tests that require a reining pattern.

Riders are allowed two different styles of reins: 1) split reins, which are not attached to each other, and thus the rider is allowed to place one finger between the reins to aid in making adjustments; and 2) "romal reins," which are joined and have a romal (a type of long quirt) on the end, which the rider holds in his/her non-reining hand, with at least 16 inches of slack between the two, and the rider is not allowed to place a finger between the reins.

The correct position for this discipline, as in all forms of riding, is a balanced seat. This is seen when a bystander can run an imaginary straight line that passes through the rider's ear, shoulder, hip, and heel.

The Western style is seen in a long stirrup length, often longer than that used by dressage riders, an upright posture (equitation riders are never to lean forward beyond a very slight inclination), and the distinctive one-handed hold on the reins. The reining hand should be bent at the elbow, held close to the rider's side, and centered over the horse's neck, usually within an inch of the saddle horn. Due to the presence of the saddle horn, a true straight line between rider's hand and horse's mouth is usually not possible. The non-reining hand either holds onto the romal, if one is used; or if split reins are used, is held in a still position, which varies as styles change, but often is also bent at the elbow and held close to the pommel of the saddle.

== Dressage seat equitation ==
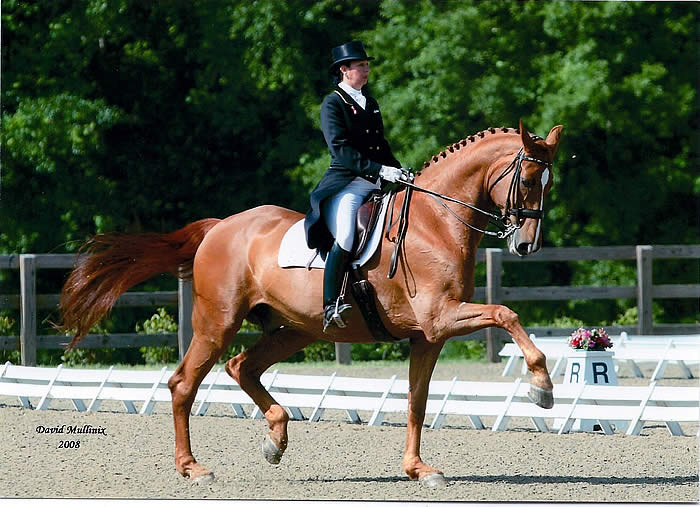
Dressage horse and rider.

Dressage seat equitation is a relatively new class offered at dressage shows. Unlike a dressage test, the horse's gaits are not judged, although the horse's frame is taken into consideration by the judge, but rather it is the rider who is evaluated. Also, instead of a single competitor in the ring, there are several riders in the ring at one time.

The rider is judged on a proper classical position. This includes evaluating leg position, seat, hands, balance, and rhythm. The rider is to be relaxed and not interfere with the horse's movement, but able to make full use of all riding aids. The rider and horse should have unity, and the rider should use the aids correctly and efficiently.

The United States Equestrian Federation outlines the rules for Dressage Seat Equitation.

== See also ==
- Equestrianism
- Equitation science
- Dressage
- Hunt seat
- Reining
- Saddle seat
- Show Jumping
