= Canter and gallop =

Equine gait

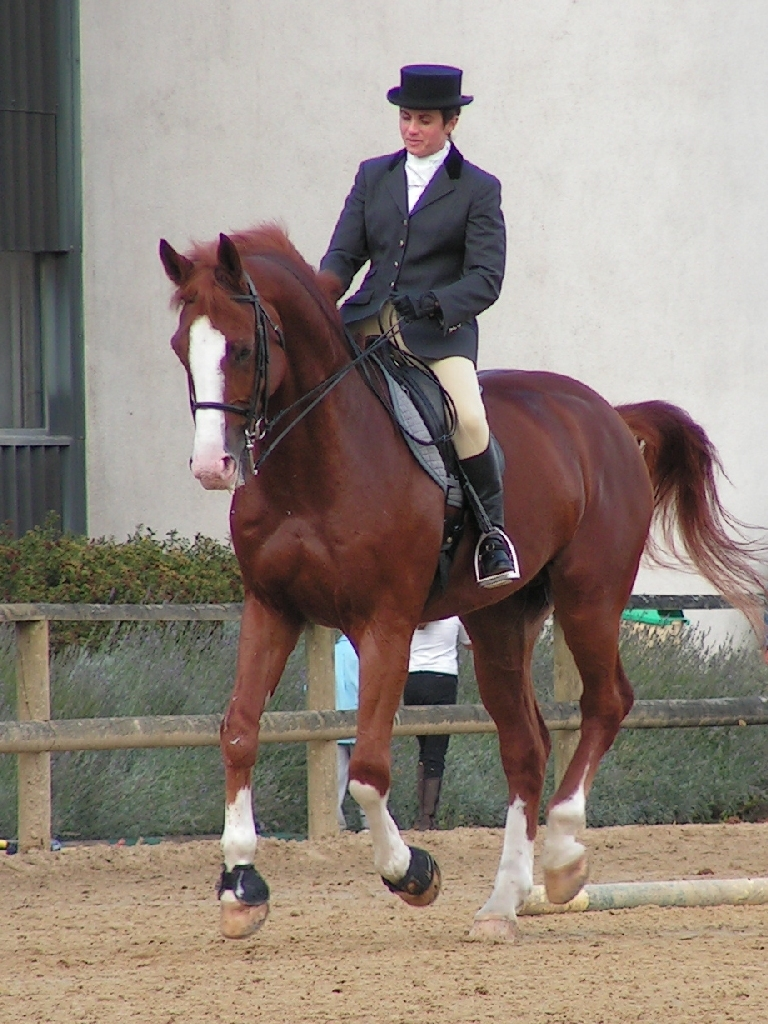
A horse and rider at the canter

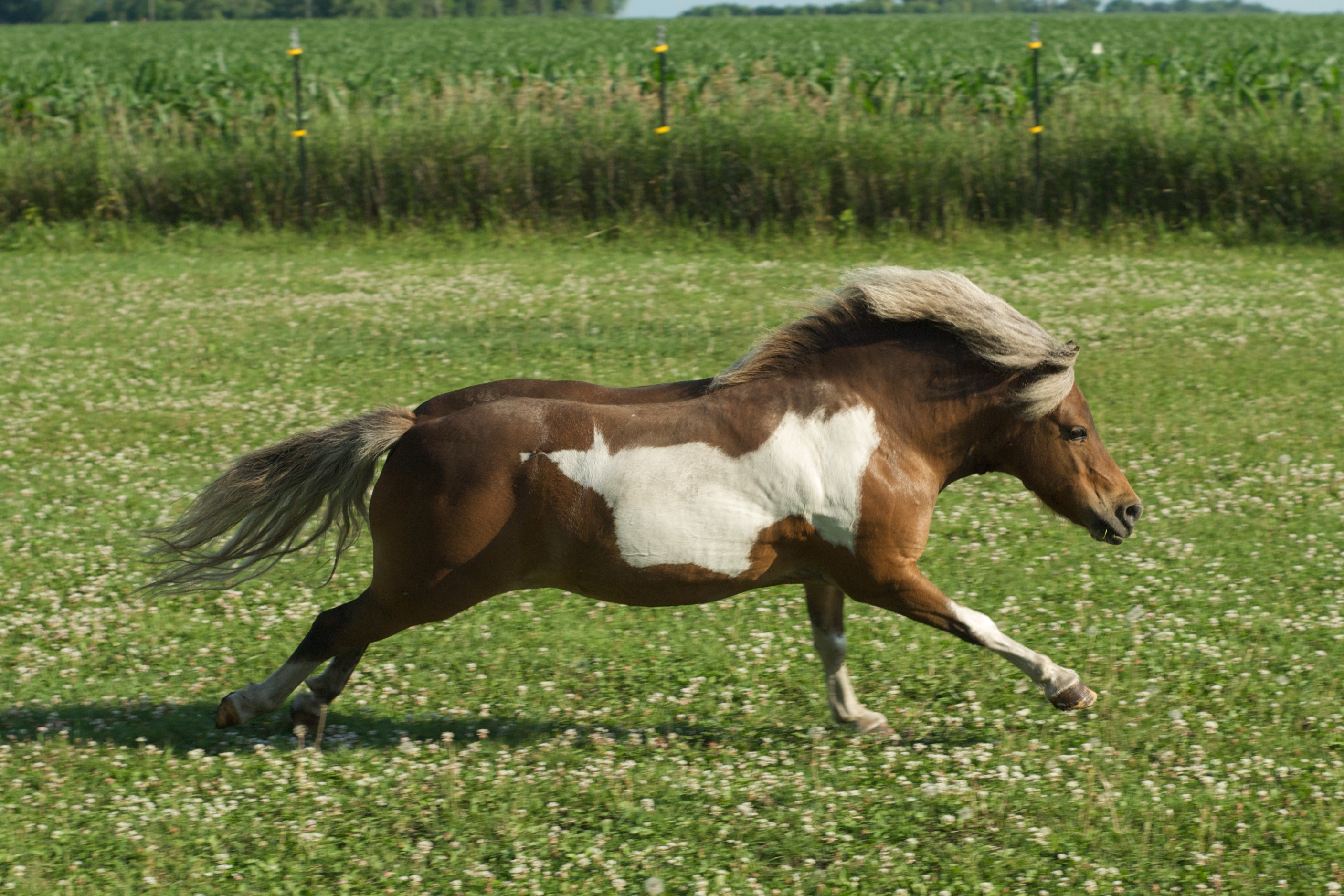
A miniature horse at a gallop

The canter and gallop are variations on the fastest gait that can be performed by a horse or other equine. The canter is a controlled three-beat gait, while the gallop is a faster, four-beat variation of the same gait. It is a natural gait possessed by all horses, faster than most horses' trot, or ambling gaits. The gallop is the fastest gait of the horse, averaging about 40 to 48 kilometres per hour (25 to 30 mph). The speed of the canter varies between 16 and 27 kilometres per hour (10 and 17 mph) depending on the length of the horse's stride. A variation of the canter, seen in western riding, is called a lope, and is generally quite slow, no more than 13–19 kilometres per hour (8–12 mph).

== Etymology ==
Since the earliest dictionaries there has been a commonly agreed suggestion that the origin of the word "canter" comes from the English city of Canterbury, a place of pilgrimage in the Middle Ages, as referred to in The Canterbury Tales, where the comfortable speed for a pilgrim travelling some distance on horseback was above that of a trot but below that of a gallop. However, a lack of compelling evidence made the 18th-century equestrian Richard Berenger remark in The History and Art of Horsemanship that "the definition must certainly puzzle all who are horsemen and all who are not" [author's italics], and suggest his own derivation, noted in contemporary dictionaries, from the Latin word cantherius, a gelding, known for its calmness of temper.

== Sequence of footfalls ==
The canter, right lead, showing three-beat footfall sequence

Muybridge's classic animation of the gallop, showing four-beat footfall sequence

The canter is a three-beat gait, meaning that there are three hoofbeats heard per stride. Each footfall is the "grounding" phase of a leg. The three footfalls are evenly spaced, and followed by the "suspension" phase of the gait, which is when all four legs are off the ground. The three beats and suspension are considered one stride. The movement for one stride is as follows:

1. Beat One: the grounding phase of the outside hind leg. At this time, the other three legs are off the ground.
2. Beat Two: the simultaneous grounding phase of the inside hind leg and outside fore leg. The inside fore leg is still off the ground. The outside hind leg (beat one), is still touching the ground, but is about to be lifted off.
3. Beat Three: The grounding phase of the inside foreleg. The outside hind leg (beat one), is off the ground. The inside hind leg and outside foreleg are still touching the ground, but are about to be lifted up.
4. The inside hindleg and outside foreleg (beat two) are lifted off the ground. The inside foreleg is the only foot supporting the horse's weight.
5. The inside foreleg is lifted off the ground.
6. Suspension: All four of the horse's legs are off the ground. The faster the horse is moving, the longer the phase of suspension is.

== Gallop ==
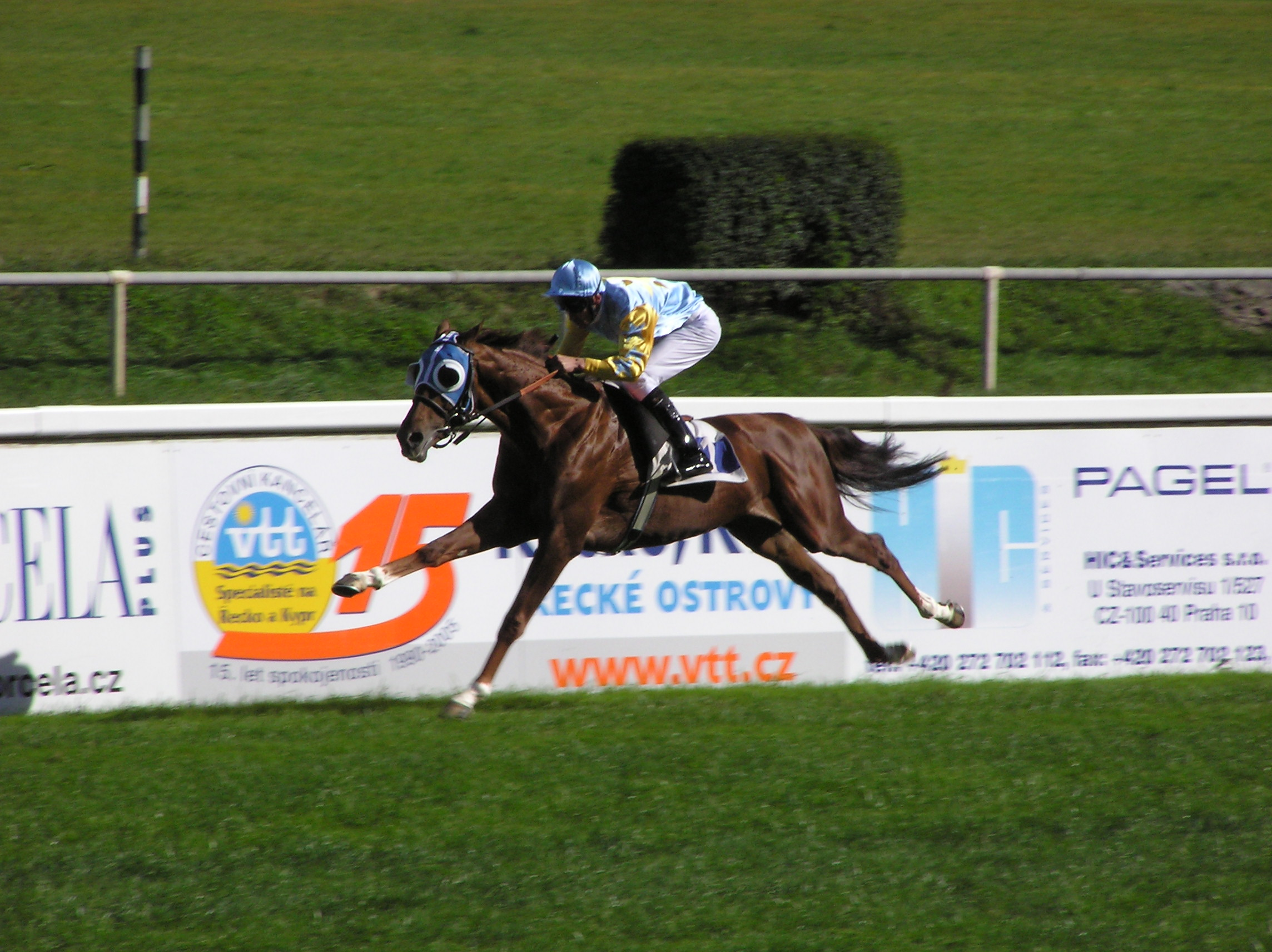
The diagonal pair (in this case, right hind and left fore) is no longer in sync at the gallop.

The canter and gallop are related gaits, so by asking the horse to gallop from a canter, the rider is simply asking the horse to lengthen its stride. When the stride is sufficiently lengthened, the diagonal pair of beat two breaks, resulting in a four beat gait, the inside hind striking first, before the outside fore. A careful listener or observer can tell an extended canter from a gallop by the presence of the fourth beat.

The gallop is the fastest gait of the horse, averaging about 40 to 48 kilometres per hour (25 to 30 mph), and in the wild is used when the animal needs to flee from predators or simply cover short distances quickly. Horses seldom will gallop more than 1.5 or 3 kilometres (0.93 or 1.86 mi) before they need to rest, though horses can sustain a moderately paced gallop for longer distances before they become winded and have to slow down.

Although the walk, trot, and canter can be collected to very short, engaged strides, the gallop if collected will turn back into a canter. The "hand gallop" of the show ring is not merely an extended canter, but a true lengthening of stride, yet still fully under control by the rider. A racing gallop, in contrast, pushes the horse to the limits of its speed.

The fastest galloping speed is achieved by the American Quarter Horse, which in a short sprint of a quarter mile (0.40 km) or less has been clocked at speeds approaching 55 miles per hour (88.5 km/h). The Guinness Book of World Records lists a Thoroughbred as having averaged 43.97 miles per hour (70.76 km/h) over a two-furlong (0.25 mi or 402 m) distance in 2008.

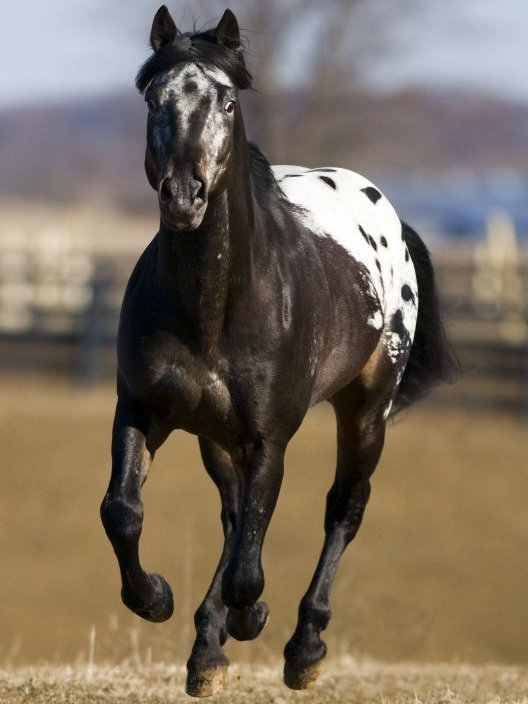
The suspension phase, all four legs momentarily off the ground

=== Leads ===
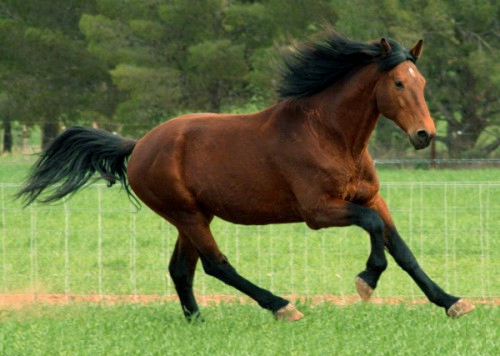
Right lead: left hind is in place, left front is currently about to hit the ground along with the right hind, right front will land in front of left front for final beat before suspension phase.

The "lead" of a canter refers to the order in which the footfalls occur. If the left hind leg is placed first (beat one), which would then be followed by the right hind and left foreleg (beat two), before the right foreleg (beat three), the horse is said to be on the "right lead". If the right hind leg is beat one, then the left foreleg will be the last leg to ground, and the horse will be said to be on the "left lead". Therefore, a person on the ground can tell which lead the horse is on by watching the front and rear legs and determining which side the legs are literally "leading", landing in front of the opposing side.

When the horse is on a lead, the legs on the inside front and hind, have greater extension than the outside front and hind. Therefore, a horse on the right lead will have its right hind (beat two) come slightly further under its body than the left hindleg had when it grounded (beat one), and the right foreleg (beat three) will reach further out from the horse's body than the left foreleg had extended (beat two).

In general, the horse is on the "correct" lead when it matches the direction it is going. So a horse turning to the right is on the right lead, a horse turning to the left is on the left lead. However, just as people find it easier to write with one hand or the other, most horses have a "better side", on which they find it easier to lead at a canter. In limited circumstances, mostly in dressage training, a horse may be deliberately asked to take the lead opposite of the direction it is traveling. In such cases, this type of canter is called a counter-canter.

A variant canter, involving the same sequence of beats but variant footfalls in beats one and two, is often referred to by equestrians as cross-firing, cross-cantering, or disunited canter, among other terms. It is generally penalized in horse show competition. To the observer, the horse appears to be leading with one leg in front, but the opposite leg behind. The problem with this sequence is in beat two: the grounded hind and foreleg are not diagonal pairs, but are on the same side of the horse. This means that the horse is balanced on only one side of its body, making it hard to maintain a rhythmical gait and maintain impulsion. Additionally, it makes for a very uncomfortable, awkward ride, producing a rolling movement.

== Types ==
The canter can be further divided by the frame and impulsion of the horse. Although there is a "collected" canter, "regular" or "working canter, and an "extended" canter, these are points on a spectrum, not ends in themselves. A truly adjustable, trained horse should be able to lengthen and shorten as much as the rider desires.

Canters
Type	Definition
Working canter	the natural canter given by a horse, with normal stride length. This is the working gait of hunt seat riders. It is also used by all other disciplines.
Medium canter	a canter between the working canter and extended canter. It is bigger and rounder than the working, with great impulsion, and very forward with moderate extension. The medium canter is common in dressage and show jumping.
Collected canter	an extremely engaged, collected gait (collection refers to having the horse's balance shifted backward towards its hind legs, with more weight taken by the hindquarters). The strides are shorter, springier, and the horse's frame is short and compressed. The collected canter is required in upper-level dressage tests. It is also very important in show jumping, as the rider often needs to shorten the horse's stride according to the distance between two fences. (Note: the second picture of the collected canter is a canter pirouette, which is a movement. However, a collected canter is needed for a canter pirouette, and it is possible to see the short stride and compressed frame of the horse).
Extended canter	an extension of the canter, where the horse's frame lengthens and the horse takes larger stride, covering as much ground as possible without losing the 3-beat gait. It is very engaged, but not a true gallop. The extended canter should have great impulsion. A flat, long canter is not a true extended canter, and is incorrect for proper work.
Hand Gallop	In the United States, show hunters may be asked to "hand gallop" when shown on the flat or in certain jumping classes. The hand gallop differs from a true gallop, in that the horse should not speed up enough to lose the 3 beat rhythm of the canter, and from the extended canter in that the horse should be allowed to lengthen its frame substantially and is not expected to engage as much as in an extended canter. While the extended canter is intended to demonstrate and improve athleticism and responsiveness to the aids, show hunters are asked to hand gallop primarily to illustrate the horse's manners and training. In the hand gallop the hunter should increase its pace without becoming excited or difficult to handle, and should respond immediately to the rider's request to return to the canter or perform a different maneuver.
Lope	a type of slow, relaxed canter seen in western horses, performed on a loose rein with less collection than a collected canter, but at about the same speed or slower. There is less suspension than in an English-style canter. The horse has a longer, less-rounded frame and carries its head lower, but the gait is still 3-beat and the horse must be well-engaged in the hindquarters to do a proper lope.

=== Motion ===
Understanding the motion of the canter is important if a person wants to ride the horse with a balanced, secure, yet flexible seat. To the rider, the horse's back feels as if it is moving both up and down as well as somewhat back and forth, not unlike the motion of a swing. When the hind legs engage (which occurs just before beat one), the horse raises its head and neck as its hind leg steps under. As the legs push off the ground (beats 1 and 2) the head and neck of the horse drops. When the leading leg (beat 3) touches the ground, the head and neck are as low as they will be for the stride, and then they begin to come back up as the horse places its weight on its leading leg. During the suspension phase, the head and neck continue back to the highest point as the hind legs come back under the body.

== Riding ==
The canter and gallop may be ridden in three ways, sitting, half-seat, and two-point. In a half-seat and/or two-point position the rider's seat is raised out of the saddle to some extent, the upper body leaning forward as needed to balance over the horse's center of gravity, and more weight is carried in the stirrups. The more forward positions allow the horse greater freedom of movement at speed, over rough terrain, or when jumping. When a rider sits the canter, the seat remains firmly in the saddle at all times, allowing a more secure position and greater control over the horse. There is some disagreement over terminology. Some scholars use the term "three point" position to describe the half-seat, others use it to describe a rider sitting all the way down in the saddle. Conversely, some instructors use the term "half seat" to describe a full two-point jumping seat.

A rider sitting the lope or canter requires relaxed hips and the upper body balanced over the center of gravity of the horse, usually achieved by slightly leaning the torso forward. The seat bones remain in contact with the saddle at all times. The rider "rolls" with the canter, allowing free movement in the hips and relaxation in the thighs. The forward incline of the rider's upper body may vary, from very upright (used in a collected canter), to slightly forward. The lower leg should remain quiet, the heel will sink down slightly and the knee angle may open with the footfalls, absorbing the shock of the gait. The hands should keep steady contact with the horse's mouth. Visually the rider keeps a straight line between the elbow and the mouth of the horse, which requires a relaxed arm that can follow the motion of the horse's neck. The rider must account for that movement by allowing the elbow angle to open and close: opening during the footfalls, and closing during the suspension phase after the footfalls. To do this, the rider needs a steady, elastic contact, rather than mechanically pushing the hands forward or back.

In a half-seat position, the rider's seat bones are lifted out of the saddle, and only the pelvis has contact. It is used for jumping when extra control via a seat aid may be necessary, especially for sharp turns, riding downhill, on the approach to potentially spooky fences, or when the rider wishes to collect the stride. This seat is a compromise, allowing the jumping rider to have greater control than in two-point, but still keeping the majority of the rider's weight off the horse's back. Half-seat is used frequently in competition over fences, and at times even in dressage training, to help lighten the horse's back. The rider in half-seat inclines their shoulders and the pelvis slightly forward, keeping their hip angle nicely open and the lower back soft.

Two-point position is ridden similar to half-seat, except the rider's seat bones are off the saddle. This position is used for jumping and galloping, as it is easy to stay out of the horse's way and gives the horse the most freedom to use its body. However, the position also provides the least amount of control and security. This position requires a rider to have good base of leg strength to perform well for long periods, and it can be quite tiring. Two-point is seen when galloping uphill or in straight lines on flat ground, doing large, wide turns at moderate speed, and when approaching a jump.

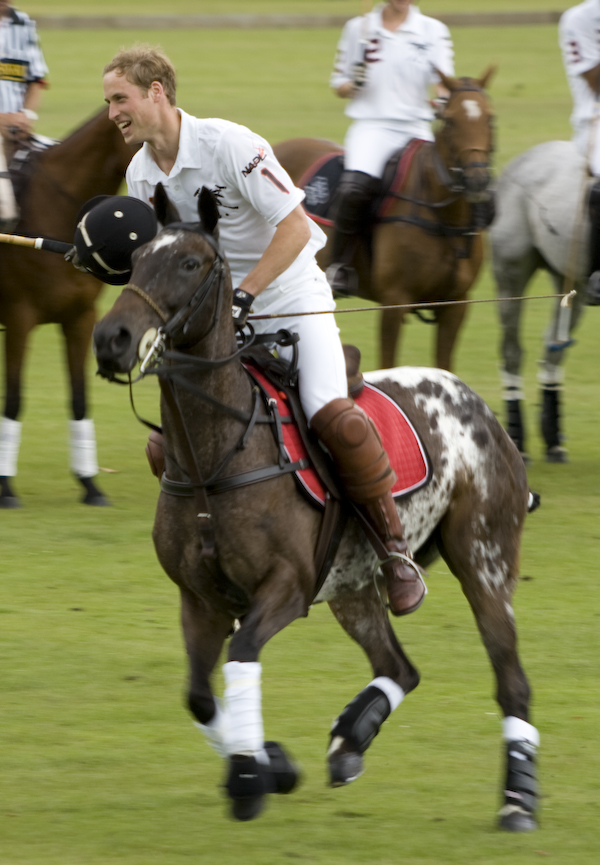
Standing

In polo and polocrosse, two-point position is called "standing" and the rider in fact stands upright in the stirrups. This helps to isolate the rider's upper body from the motion of the horse, and to allow the rider's hips to rotate as the rider turns sideways in order to swing the playing stick (polo mallet, polocrosse racquet) on the side the horse opposite the stick hand. Some polo instructors recommend standing in the saddle for all strokes.

Another variant is seen in horse racing, where the jockey rides with extremely short stirrups and the body inclined well forward, generally with little or no contact with the seat bones.

== Aids for the canter depart ==
The rider may ask for a canter depart (aids for the horse to step into the canter) on the flat from trot, walk, or halt. There are three ways to ask for the canter depart while on the flat, which may be used according to the horse's level of training.

Additionally, the rider may ask for the canter as the horse jumps a fence (if the fence was taken at the walk, trot, or halt) or may ask for the horse to switch leads over the fence.

=== Outside lateral aids ===
Aids: The rider applies the outside leg slightly further back from its normal position, which activates the outside hind (the first beat of the intended lead). At the same time, he or she uses the outside rein to flex the horse's head toward the outside, which frees up the animal's inside shoulder, encouraging it to fall into that lead. If the rider were to ask for the left lead, for example, he or she would apply the right leg behind the girth and use the right rein to turn the horse's head to the right. To make the rider's intent even clearer, the horse may be angled slightly toward the outside rail of the arena, which will guide it into taking the correct lead as it goes towards the unobstructed inside, and also discourages the horse from simply running onto the forehand.

Purpose and Drawbacks: These aids are preferred for green horses, as they are clear and simple. However, they bend the horse in the direction opposite of the turn, resulting in a crooked canter.

=== Diagonal aids ===
Aids: The rider applies the outside leg slightly further back from its neutral position, thereby activating the horse's outside hind leg, while adding the inside rein aid to indicate the direction of travel. This technique is later refined, first asking with the outside leg aid before adding the inside rein and a push with the inside seat bone. The refined sequence usually makes for a quicker and more balanced depart, and prepares the horse for use of the inside lateral aids.

Purpose and Drawbacks: An intermediate step, this is the most commonly used sequence of aids by amateur riders, and is usually the one taught to beginners. The canter is generally straighter when asked in this way than when asked with the outside lateral aids, but still may not have the correct bend throughout the body.

=== Inside lateral aids ===
Preparation and Timing: The rider prepares for the transition by using half-halts to balance the horse, and bends him slightly in the intended direction. Since the first footfall of the canter is the outside hind leg, the rider times the aids to ask for the canter when the outside hind leg is engaged (i.e. under the body). So, at the trot the rider would ask when the inside front leg touches the ground (its shoulder will be forward). At the walk, the rider will ask when the outside shoulder starts to move back.

Aids:To ask for the depart, the rider adds the inside leg near the girth, pushes slightly with the inside seat bone, and uses inside direct rein to indicate the direction of travel. The outside leg (slightly behind the girth) and outside rein passively support the inside aids. The combination of aids asks the horse to bend to the inside, directing it to pick up the correct lead.

Purpose: This is the most advanced sequence, used for simple- and flying-changes as well as counter-canter, and requires the horse to be properly "on the aids." These aids result in a prompt response from the horse and a balanced, engaged canter. It is appropriate for more advanced riders with independent seats, and for horses that have a good base of training.

=== Asking for the canter over fences ===
Purpose: The rider may need a specific lead after landing from a fence, especially useful for show jumping. A rider may also trot a fence (and even walk or jump a fence from a standstill), and wish to cue the horse to canter on after the fence. Asking the horse for a specific lead can also be used as a training technique for horses who anticipate turning a certain direction.

Aids: To ask for a specific lead while in the air, the rider should look in the intended direction of travel, not down. The rider should lead the horse in the direction of the turn by applying the opening rein aid without pulling backward, while the other hand releases as usual. The outside leg is moved slightly back, and the rider adds slightly more weight to the inside knee. However, the rider should not shift weight so much that he or she becomes unbalanced or has the heels come up.

Exercises: In general, horses tend to switch their leads from the one on which they approached as they go over an obstacle. So if they approached on the right lead, they will land on the left. This is because of how they line up their hind legs as they push on takeoff. A rider can practice asking for a certain lead by trotting a small vertical, and asking for the canter over the fence.

== Aids ==
The canter stride should be easily lengthened and shortened, making the horse "adjustable" between fences so that it may meet the distance correctly. Lengthening and shortening are also key components to dressage tests.

In general, the rider should use half-halts as the horse is raising its head and neck upward (during the suspension phase), because this is when the horse is engaging its hindquarters.

=== Aids for shortening stride ===
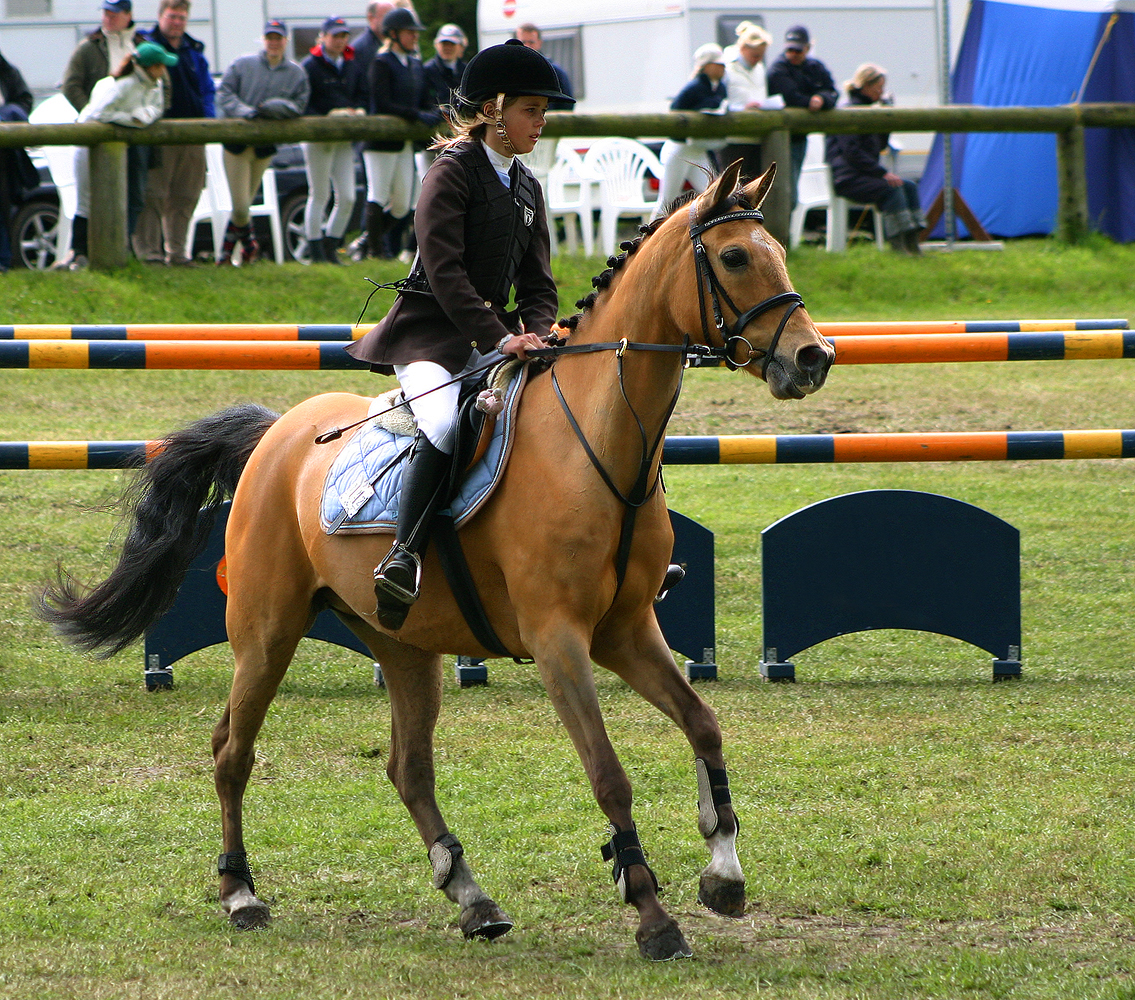
A shortened canter stride

When the horse shortens its stride, it rebalances its weight toward the hindquarters. In the actual collected canter, the horse should carry the majority of its weight on the hind end, rather than the front end. The hindquarters will sink lower toward the ground, and the forehand will appear higher and lighter. The horse should maintain tempo, rhythm, and impulsion.

To shorten the horse's stride, the rider sits taller and lengthens the spine. He or she also performs multiple half-halts in rhythm with the horse's strides, using the restraining aids to ask the horse to engage the hindquarters, yet keeping the leg to the horse's sides to keep impulsion. The rider should not hold the aids or hang onto the horse's mouth when shortening. If the rider does not keep sufficient leg on, the horse will simply fall onto the forehand or break into the trot or walk.

=== Aids for lengthening stride ===
The lengthened canter results in a longer frame from the horse, with a larger stride. The horse should still maintain impulsion, and care should be taken that it is not driven forward onto the forehand. Rhythm and tempo stay the same.

To lengthen the canter, the rider uses his or her legs against the horse's sides in rhythm with the gait. The leg aids should be applied as the hind legs are engaging. This is the time when the rider's seat moves forward in the canter stride. Additionally, the rider should engage the seat at the same time as the leg aids are used, "rolling" is forward with the canter motion. Contact may be lightened, but should not be dropped. The rider should not lean forward.

== Importance while riding ==
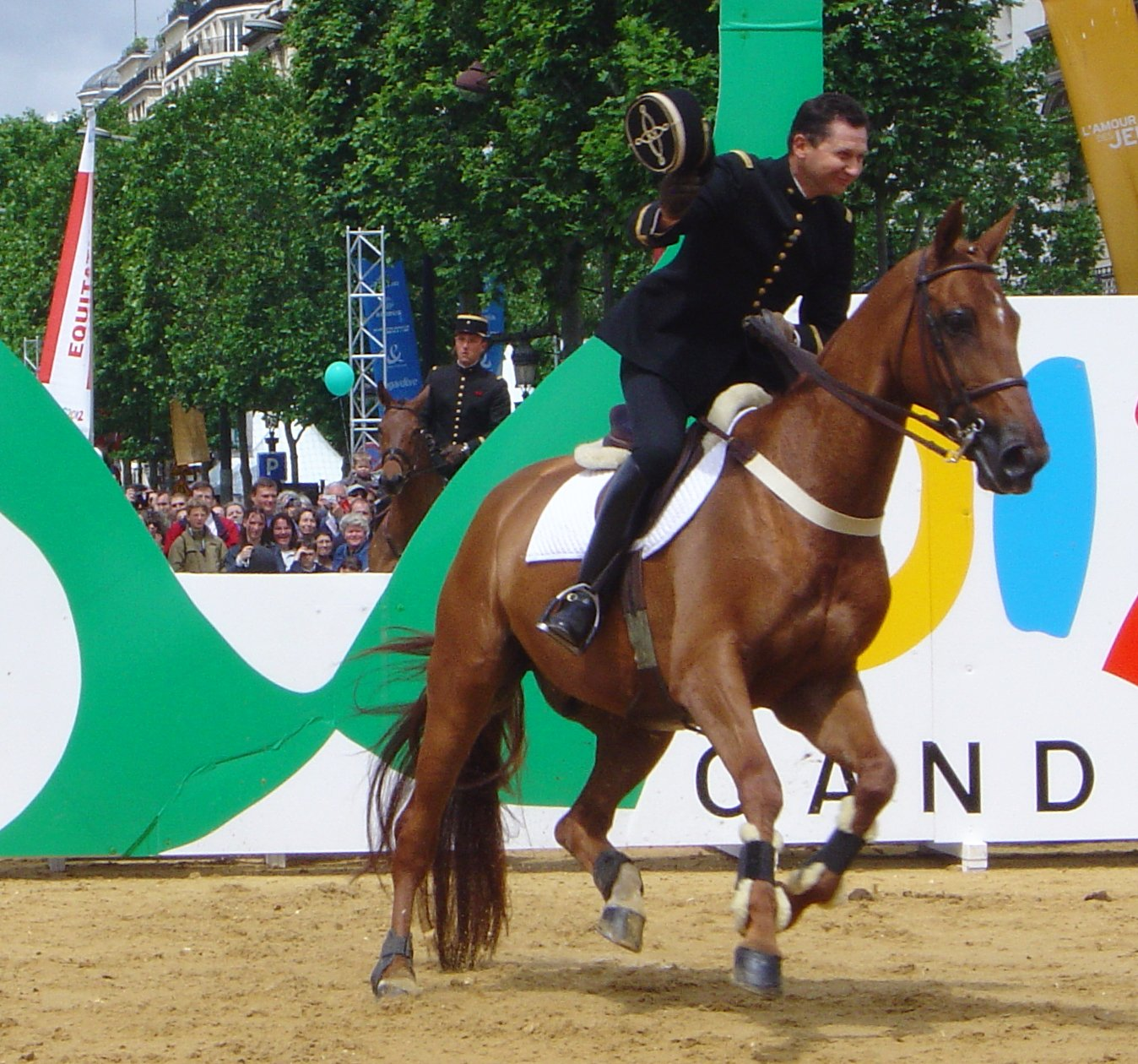
The horse leans into the direction of the turn, here, the left lead.

=== Importance of leads ===
The most important function of the correct lead is for balance. While they are unimportant on a straight line, they can greatly influence the athletic ability of a horse on turns, especially if the turn is tight or performed at speed. Horses naturally lean in to the direction they are turning. Since they extend their lead-side legs further out, they may use them to balance themselves as they lean into that direction. So, if on the right lead while taking a right turn, the right hind will be positioned more under the body, and the right foreleg more in front of the body, to act as a stabilizer as the horse turns.

When on the incorrect lead, the horse is usually left unbalanced. In this case, correct riding can make the difference in the horse's performance. Good riding can keep the legs positioned correctly enough so that the horse is still able to perform the turn. Poor riding will hinder rather than help the horse, and in extreme situations such as a tight turn at speed, the horse may lose its legs footing and fall.

=== Movements ===
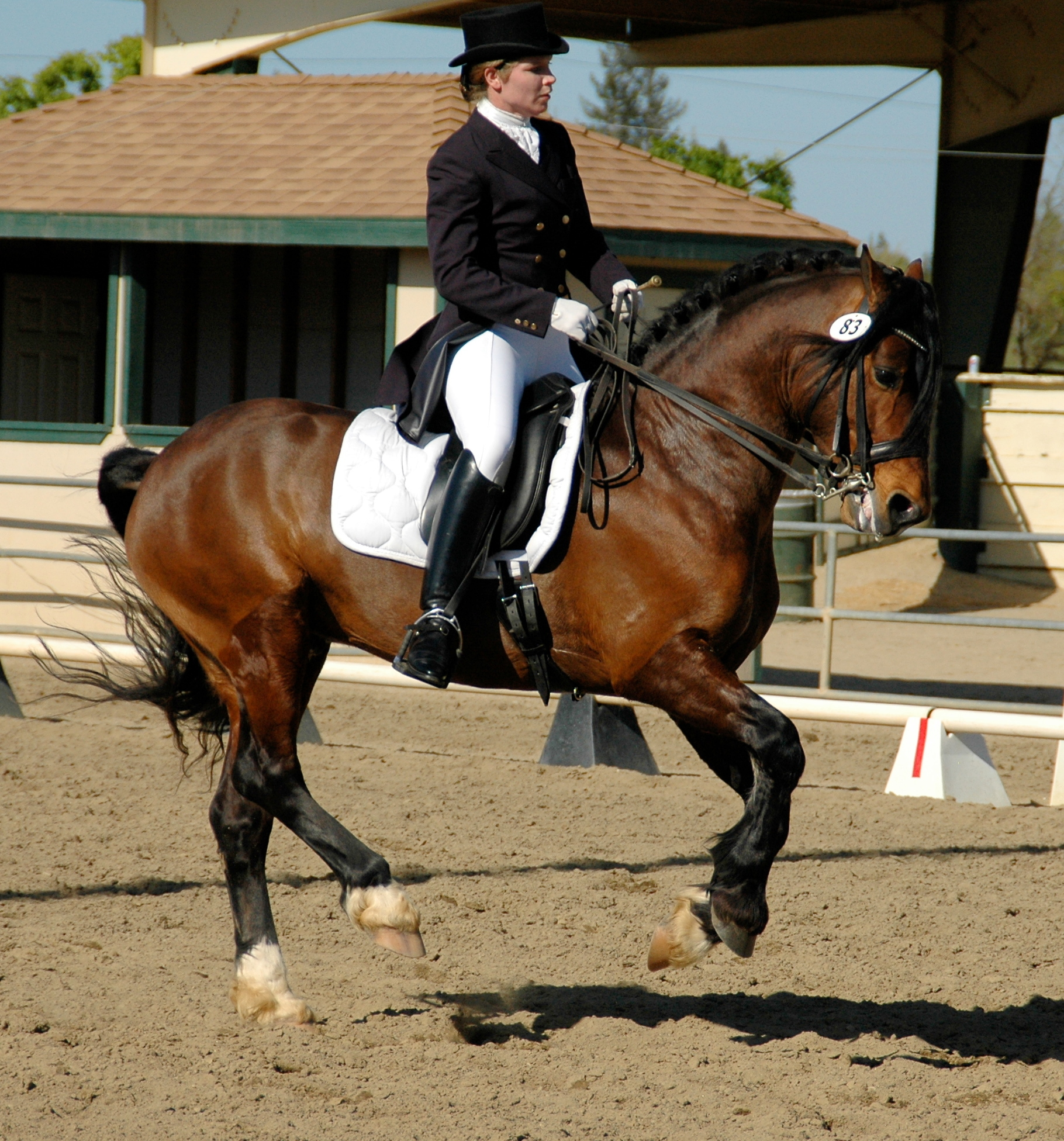
Horse setting up for a flying change of lead

Specific movements of the canter are often required in dressage competition, but are also important for the general training of any riding horse for any discipline.

Movement
Counter-canter	The rider asks for the "wrong" lead. This is a movement asked for in dressage tests. It is also a general schooling movement, as the horse must stay very balanced to keep a nice canter while on the opposite lead, and is an important step to teaching the horse the flying change.
Simple change	The horse changes lead through the trot or, more correctly, through the walk. When changing through the walk, the horse should not break into the trot. Simple changes are a preparatory step before teaching the horse flying changes. They are also asked for in dressage. In jumping, they may be used as an alternative for horses that do not yet know how to perform a flying change, so the rider may still change the lead between fences.
Flying change	The horse performs a lead change during the suspension phase of the canter, switching leads in the air. It is a relatively advanced movement. In dressage, the horse may perform multiple changes, one after the other (tempis). This is judged in dressage (both Grand Prix and eventing) and reining competition, as well as show hunter classes and hunt seat equitation. Although not specifically judged, it is important in all jumping competition, including the jumping phases of eventing, show jumping, and fox hunting.
Pirouette	The horse pirouettes around its hindquarters, moving the forehand in a large circle, while the hind feet stay on a smaller circle almost in place. This movement is used in dressage, and requires a very collected canter. It is also a general training movement, used to encourage and test the engagement of the horse's canter.
Roll-back turn	Where a horse does a 180 degree turn at the canter. When used in show jumping, eventing, and hunt seat equitation, the rider lands from a jump, then makes a tight turn (usually 180 degrees) to the next one. Usually used by western riders in reining patterns where the horse is brought to a sliding stop, but without any hesitation immediately spins 180 degrees over its hocks and begins to run in the opposite direction.
Rollback	Where a horse does a 180 degree turn at the canter. When used in show jumping, eventing, and hunt seat equitation, the rider lands from a jump, then makes a tight turn (usually 180 degrees) to the next one. Usually used by western riders in reining patterns where the horse is brought to a sliding stop, but without any hesitation immediately spins 180 degrees over its hocks and begins to run in the opposite direction.
