= Pirouette (dressage) =

Complex horse maneuver

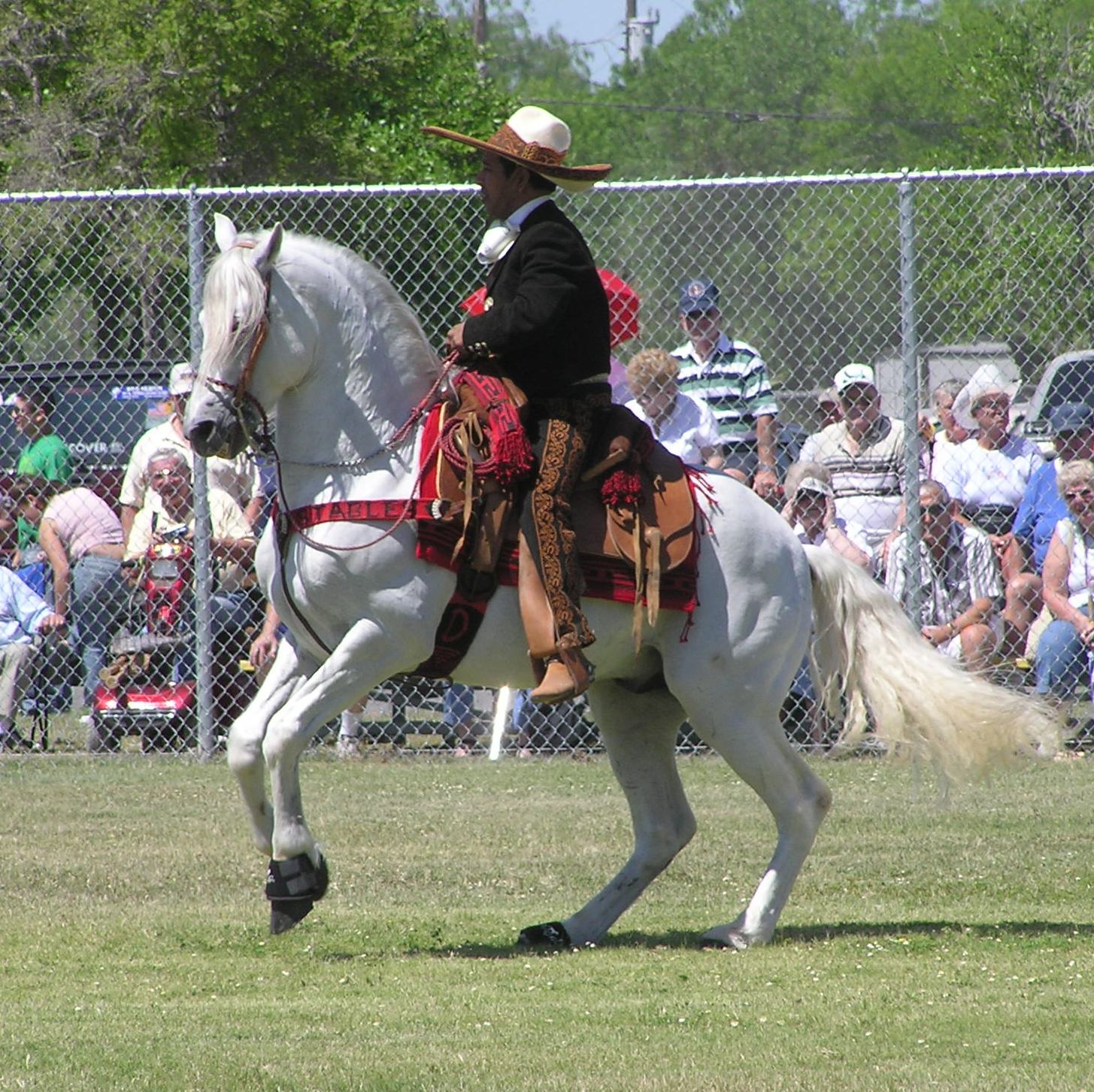
Beginning of a canter pirouette to the right.

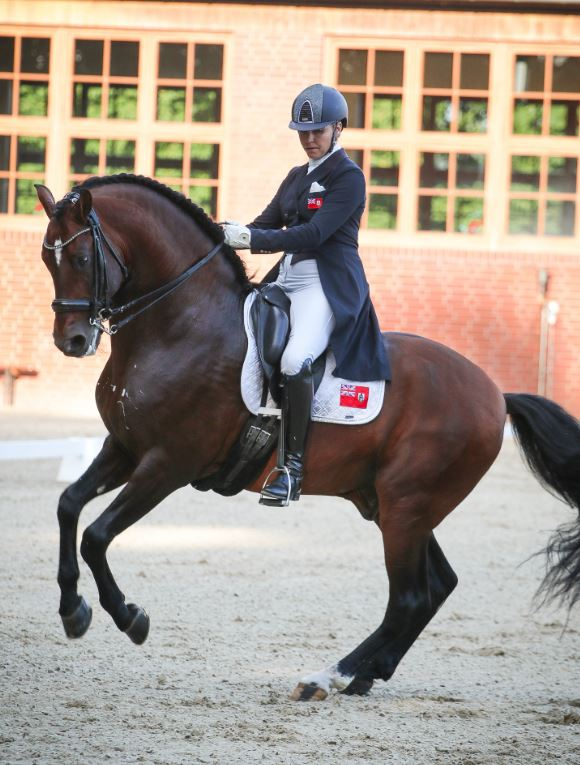
Canter pirouette to the left. The horse has transferred its center of gravity towards the hind quarters. Its hind legs are then raised and lowered almost in the same place in the canter rhythm.

A pirouette is a two-track lateral movement asked of a horse in dressage, in which the animal makes a circle with its front end around a smaller circle made by the hind end. Specifically, the front legs and outside hind leg should travel around the inside hind leg, with the horse remaining slightly bent in the direction of travel. From the part of the rider it needs "much practice in collecting and balancing the horse and in using the aids correctly." The horse may perform the movement at the walk or canter, although the pirouette at the walk is more commonly called the turn on the haunches. It "can also be executed at piaffe."

As in all dressage, the horse should remain relaxed, engaged, and responsive, with the poll as the highest point. Ideally, the pirouette will be almost in-place, although many horses perform a slightly larger pirouette. A pirouette may be performed either as a 360-degree turn (full pirouette), 270 degrees (¾-pirouette), or 180-degrees (half-pirouette). Some dressage tests call for two full pirouettes in a row (720 degrees).

== Number of beats and strides ==
The walk stride has to consist of four beats. Pivoting around one hindleg without lifting it is not considered a correct movement: "The inside hind foot is raised and put down almost in the same place". When performed at the canter, the gait actually is meant to remain a three-beat action with a moment of suspension. However, the high level of collection, strength and discipline required means that it often degenerates into an incorrect four-beat motion. The correct half-pirouette in canter "should take three steps" or strides, the whole pirouette should take "six to eight" strides.

== Faults ==
The canter pirouette is a very difficult exercise when performed correctly.

- The horse should not throw his body around, fall inward, or let his hindquarters fall to the outside, but should remain balanced.
- The horse should not plant one of his hind legs and move around it—as seen in the western spin—but should lift them up and place them down with each stride, maintaining the purity of the gait.
- The horse should not lose the rhythm of the canter, or fall onto his forehand.
- The horse should not make an oval-shaped movement with his hindquarters, but should inscribe a perfect circle.
- The horse should never step back.
- Each bound should be equal.
- It must not degenerate into a four-beat motion or lose its moment of suspension.

== Sources ==
- FEI Rules for Dressage Events 2011
- Purity of Gaits in the Canter Pirouette
- Comparison of the temporal kinematics of the canter pirouette and collected canter (study on the footfalls of the canter pirouette)
