= Lateral movement =

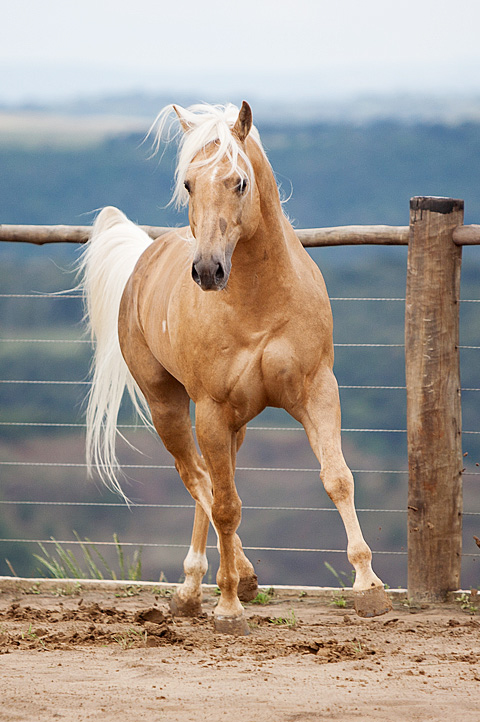
A horse moving at liberty, moving laterally in trot.

Lateral movements or lateral flexions within equestrianism, have a specific meaning, used to refer to movements made by a horse where the animal is moving in a direction other than straight forward. They are used both in training and in competition, vary in difficulty, and are used in a progressive manner, according to the training and physical limitations of the animal.

== Uses ==
Lateral movements are important tools to help with training problems, as they encourage better balance, suppleness, and response to the riding aids. When performed correctly, they ask the horse to move their legs further under their body, thus increasing impulsion and improving movement, and can help build muscle evenly on both sides. They are also required in some competition, such as dressage and reining. Additionally, they may have a practical purpose, such as allowing the rider to easily open a gate, or to ask the horse to move sideways to avoid an obstacle.

== Common problems ==
Incorrectly ridden lateral movements, such as those that emphasize the horse to be forced into a position, rather than maintaining rhythm, relaxation, straightness, and acceptance of the aids, will create more training problems than they solve. The horse will usually become resistant and stiff, instead of more supple.

When performing a lateral movement, the rider should strive to maintain:

- Forwardness: lateral movements usually cause many horses to slow their tempo and lose their rhythm and freedom of movement. While a slight loss of forward movement might be acceptable when the horse is first learning what is expected, the rider should always ask for the horse to move forward after the movement is completed, and work towards keeping the horse's rhythm and freedom of movement constant before, during, and after the movement.
- Straightness: The rider should always keep correct bend through the movements, with the horse moving from inside leg to outside rein. Incorrect bend, such as the shoulders or haunches falling in or out, decreases the benefits of the exercise (such as balance, impulsion, and collection), thereby eliminating the purpose of the movement. It can also teach a horse to move in a crooked manner. The rider should be especially wary, as many horses will try to do movements with incorrect bend because it is physically easier. If a horse is having a very difficult time maintaining correct bend, it is usually an indication that the horse is not ready for a movement physically, and it is best to go back to a slightly easier exercise (for example, back to shoulder-fore from shoulder-in) or perform movements to help strengthen him muscularly. If the horse can maintain the bend for one or two steps, and then loses the bend, the rider should work slowly, gradually building a greater number of quality steps. Forcing a horse to do something before he is ready for it will never help his training. The rider should always begin and end a lateral movement with the horse moving on a straight line.
- Correct position of the rider: Some riders have a habit of riding crookedly when performing lateral movements, especially if the horse tends to do so. To counteract this, it is often a good idea to have a person on the ground watch your position. Common faults to avoid include the dropping of a shoulder, raising or lowering a hand, collapsing a hip, leaning (rather than staying centered over the saddle), and twisting the body. Although it may be possible to perform correct movements when the rider's body is contorted, it makes it more difficult, decreases the balance of the rider, and reduces the independence of the seat which tends to decrease the clarity of the aids. Loss of position also tends to give incorrect signals to the horse, and if it creates a stiff seat, will make the horse move stiffly, discourage impulsion, suppleness, and forwardness, and therefore decrease the benefit of the exercise.

== Movements in one place ==
There are three movements in place that are commonly used in dressage training: turn on the forehand, turn on the haunches, and the pirouette. Additionally, the pivot on the hindquarters and turn on the center are seen in Western riding. The roll-back turn, seen in jumping events and in reining, is a variation on the pirouette. All these movements are performed in relatively one place, in a circular motion.

The turn on the forehand is the simplest of the exercises, asking the horse to move his hindquarters around his forehand, so that the hindquarters inscribe an arc. The turn on the haunches asks the horse to move his forehand around the hindquarters, so that the forelegs inscribe an arc, with the horse bent in the direction of the turn. It is therefore more difficult than the turn on the forehand, requiring better balance and engagement. The pirouette is the most difficult and advanced maneuver, asking the horse to bend in the direction of movement and remain engaged, and requiring collection.

The pivot on the hindquarters (or spin) is commonly seen in reining, and asks the horse to ground the inside hind leg and pivot forelegs around that point. The turn on the center asks the horse to turn around an imaginary pivot point located at the center of his barrel. The horse bends in the direction of the turn, moving his forehand in the direction of the turn and his hind end in the opposite direction. This allows the horse to turn in a very confined area. Neither movement is practiced today in dressage (although the turn on the center used to be a training movement in the 18th century).

These movements ask the horse to move away from leg pressure while bent, sending the energy of the horse on a circular rather than sideways path, and therefore require a greater application of the restraining aids.

== Movements with sideways motion ==
The side pass (also called the full pass or full travers), leg yield, and half-pass all ask the horse to move sideways.

The leg-yield and half-pass are seen in dressage, and require the horse to have forward movement, resulting in the horse moving in a diagonal line. The main difference between the two movements is the direction of bend: with the horse bent in the direction of travel in the half-pass, and kept straight in the leg-yield. Therefore, the half-pass is much more difficult, requiring greater engagement and collection from the horse. The half-pass is a variation on the three-track movement, haunches-in, although it is a two-track movement itself.

In the side pass, the horse moves sideways without stepping forward, and must be executed from a halt. It originated in the cavalry, to help correct the spacing of two horses that were side-by-side in a line. Today it is seen used in the western disciplines, or by police horses. Additionally, it is seen in the lower-level dressage tests in Austria.

These movements teach the horse to properly move sideways away from leg pressure.

== Three- and four-track movements ==
The shoulder-fore, shoulder-in, haunches-in (travers), or haunches-out (renvers), place the horse's body in such a way that he makes 3 or 4 tracks with his feet, instead of the usual two seen when the horse is straight. This can best be seen on footing after it has been dragged: a horse moving straight forward will produce two "lines" of hoofprints. A horse performing shoulder-fore will make 4 tracks (one track per hoof). A horse performing haunches-in or -out, or shoulder-in, will make three tracks. Haunches-in and haunches-out vary only in the direction the horse is bent relative to the arena wall.

The shoulder-fore is an elementary step toward the more advanced shoulder-in, while haunches-in and -out are generally considered the most difficult exercises. Shoulder-in encourages the horse to engage his inside hind leg and to raise his back. Haunches-in and -out also encourage engagement of the inside hind leg, as well as the transfer of the horse's weight back to his hindquarters (collection).

Flexion and Footprints of different Lateral Movements

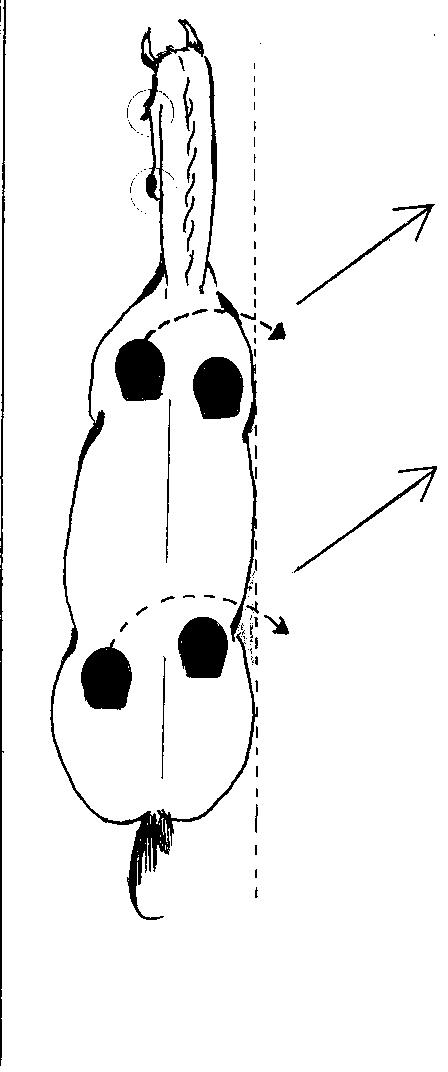
Leg-yield

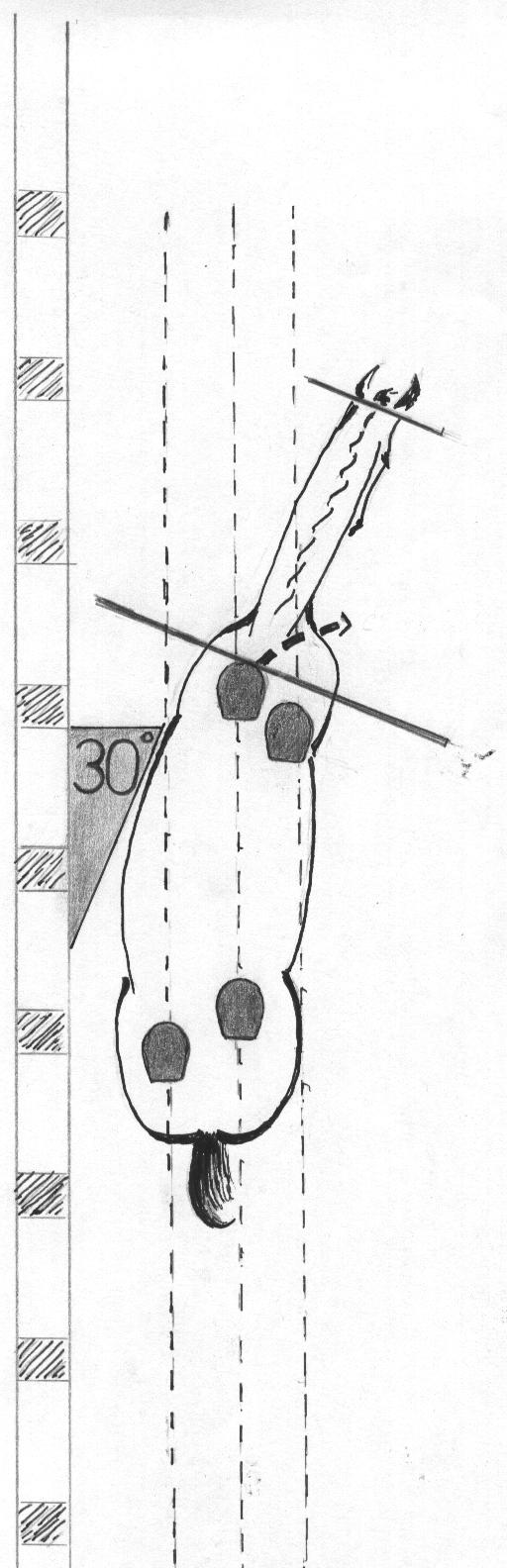
Shoulder-in

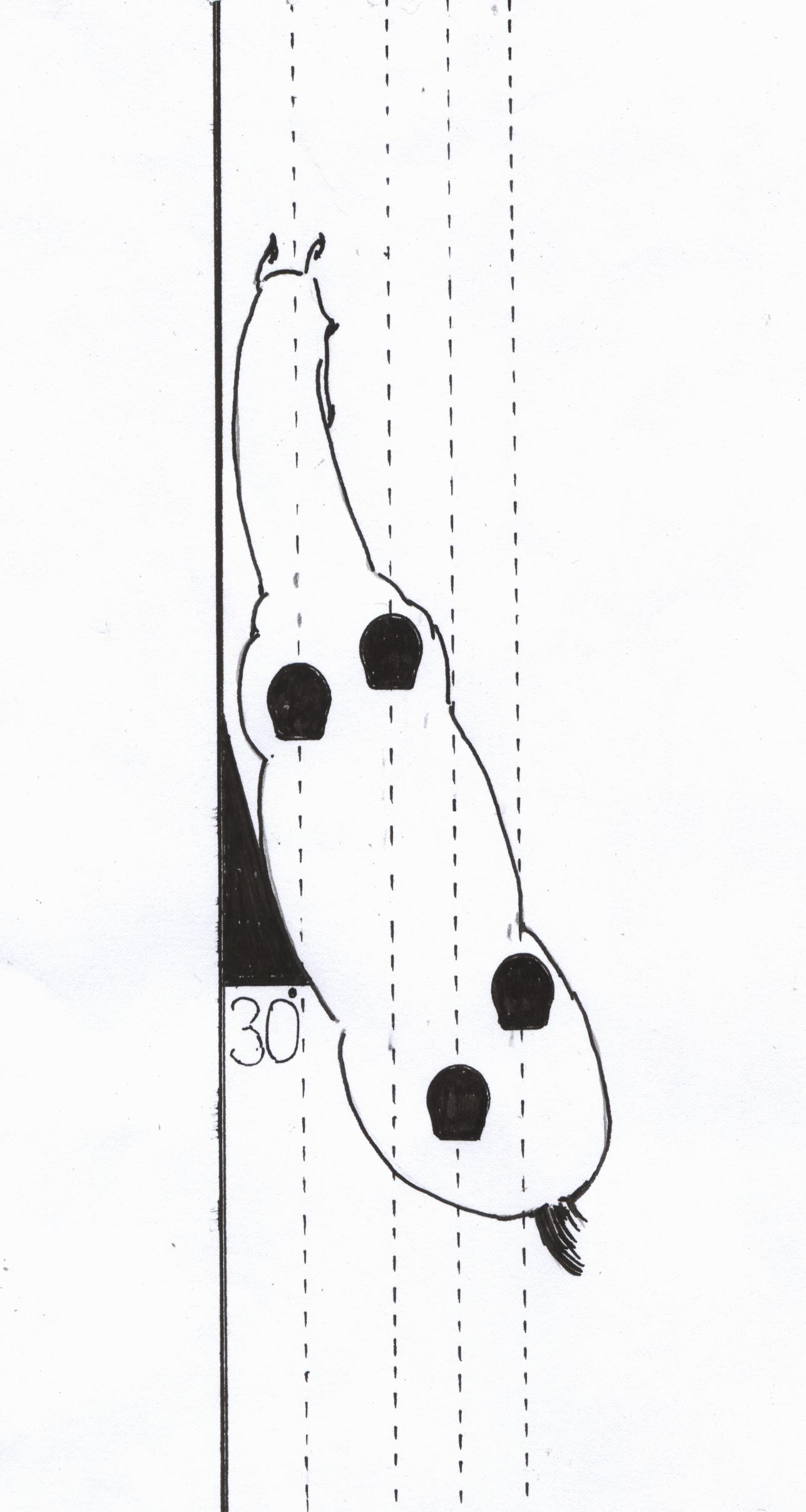
Travers (Haunches-in)

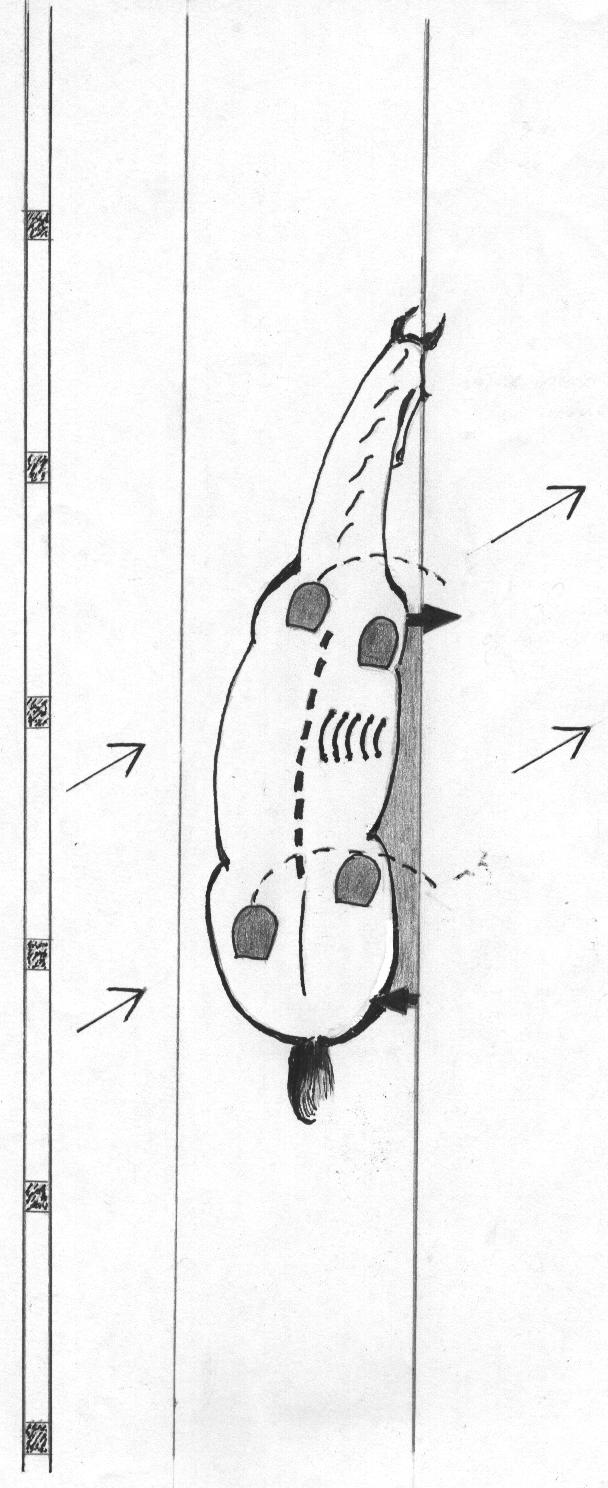
Half pass

== Sources ==
- Richard Davison, Dressage Priority Points, Howell Book House, New York 1995, ISBN 0-87605-932-9
- Jennie Loriston-Clarke, The Complete Guide to Dressage. How to Achieve Perfect Harmony between You and Your Horse. Principal Movements in Step-by-step Sequences Demonstrated by a World Medallist, Quarto Publishing plc, London 1987, reprinted 1993, ISBN 0-09-174430-X
