= Equitation science =

Equitation science is defined as "the application of scientific methods to assess objectively the welfare of horses undergoing training." It promotes an evidence-based understanding of horse-rider interactions. The goal is to apply valid, quantitative scientific methods to identify what training techniques are ineffective or painful, and to improve the horse-rider relationship by explaining horse training from a learning theory perspective that removes anthropomorphism and emotiveness. It can aid the training process by clarifying the roles of positive versus negative reinforcement, punishment, and by identifying stimuli that provoke unwanted responses or pain in horses. Equitation science uses psychological principles such as learning theory as well as equine ethology and biomechanics. It uses objective measures to score performance during training and competitions and identifies techniques that may result in equine suffering.

Recent technological advances have now made it possible to measure the strength of a rider's signals. Thus, riding concepts such as ‘contact’ and ‘lightness’ can now be evaluated with calibrated rein tension gauges, or via spurs and riding boots made from pressure-sensitive material. Radiographic studies can give insights into the horse's mouth – the position of different bit types and positional changes in response to rein tension. Measuring pressures beneath the saddle on the horse's back is valuable for assessing saddle fit and to circumvent back problems caused by ill-fitting saddles. Equitation science uses physiological measurements such as heart rate, blood, urine and saliva analyses to evaluate the comfort and stress level of the horse. It also evaluates behavioural indicators of ineffective horse-rider communication and conflict such as teeth grinding, tail swishing, rearing or bucking.

Using a multidisciplinary scientific approach that involves veterinarians, animal and behavioural scientists, psychologists, engineers, and professional riders and trainers, equitation science encourages the use of appropriate training techniques that result in fewer injuries and behavioural problems, enhance the horses’ lifespan and the safety of both horse and rider.

== International Society for Equitation Science (ISES) ==
The International Society for Equitation Science (ISES) unites academics and practitioners. Its mission is to promote and encourage the application of objective research and advanced practice which will ultimately improve the welfare of horses in their associations with humans. During discussions following the Havemeyer Foundation Workshop on Horse Behavior and Welfare in Iceland in 2002, the idea of establishing a society devoted to equitation science was first raised. In 2007, the ISES was founded by individuals with expertise in various equine fields of knowledge from around the world.
