= Half-halt =

Instruction from equestrian to horse

The half-halt is a specific riding aid given by an equestrian to his horse, in which the driving aids and restraining aids are applied in quick succession. It is sometimes thought of as an "almost halt," asking the horse to prepare to halt in balance, before pushing it onward to continue in its gait.

== Uses ==
The main purpose of the half-halt is to rebalance the horse, asking it to carry its weight slightly more on his hindquarters and less on its forehand. Additionally, it may be used as a warning signal to the horse, calling its attention back to the rider to tell it that it is about to be asked to do something, such as perform a transition between or within a gait, make a turn, perform a difficult movement, or jump an obstacle. It can also be used to encourage the horse to take a lighter contact with the bit. The half-halt should not make the horse break into a different gait. However, repeated half-halts are used to help collect a gait.

Half-halts are universally useful, regardless of riding discipline, although they are used in great abundance in the dressage arena, where perfect control of the horse is required.

== Performing the half-halt ==
The half-halt: the rider sits up and deepens her seat as she applies the rein aids, then immediately releases. The entire process is completed in one step of the trot, and then repeated slightly softer.

The half-halt may be performed two ways, both of which are commonly used by various skilled horse people. The first is a split-second application of the driving aids, to create energy, which is then quickly and immediately harnessed with the restraining aids, and then released. The second is the opposite approach: an application of the restraining aids, asking the horse to "almost halt" and bring its hindquarters under itself in the process, then immediately applying the driving aids to maintain the gait. In both cases, the driving and restraining aids should never be applied for a prolonged period, as that will only cause the horse to lean against the bit, tighten its back, and finally ignore the aids. The yielding of the aids is just as important as the application of the aids.

The degree of pressure applied by the aids will vary greatly between horses, depending on the animal's training, temperament, balance, and the situation in which the half-halt is given. The degree of the aid is usually performed by instinct and feel, a result of experience from the rider, and often one half-halt will be slightly different from the one preceding it, depending on the horse's balance and the requirements of the upcoming exercise. However, the aids should not be so great that they signal the horse to make a transition.

In dressage, the primary restraining aids will be made by bracing the lower back and briefly preventing the hips from following, while adding slight rein pressure, although very well-trained and sensitive horses will respond simply to a deepening of the seat. When jumping, especially if the rider is in two-point position, the rider may instead apply the restraining aids by sinking down slightly into their heels and bringing his shoulders more upright, adding slight rein pressure as needed. In extreme situations, such as when a horse is galloping and excited, it may be necessary to use even more rein pressure to ensure the restraining aids are respected, which may even result in a harsh jerk. This is reserved for the worst-case scenario, when the horse needs to be rapidly re-balanced (for example, due to an upcoming obstacle), and usually only occurs if the horse is ignoring the rider or if the rider did not prepare the horse properly in advance. The driving aids are created by the legs and by softening the seat.

== Timing ==
According to Thomas Ritter, the best time to apply the half-halt is the moment when the hind leg it is meant to control touches the ground.

"When it first touches down in front of the vertical, it carries, i.e. the haunches flex. That is the correct moment for the half halt. As soon as the hind leg passes the vertical, however, it starts to thrust. If you were to half halt against the thrusting leg, the horse would brace against you and either go against, above or behind he bit. If you half halt when the leg is in the air, you would shorten the stride and prevent the hind leg from stepping under. It would have to set down prematurely, maybe not even reaching the vertical, much less reaching in front of it. That way, the carrying phase would be shortened or even made impossible. The result would be loss of balance and relaxation not to mention collection."
