= Riding aids =

Cues from rider to horse

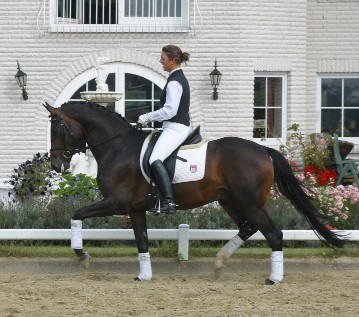
A rider with a well-balanced, independent seat, allowing her to give precise aids.

Riding aids are the cues a rider gives to a horse to communicate what they want the animal to do. Riding aids are broken into the natural aids and the artificial aids.

== Natural aids ==
Natural aids are those of the rider's body, and should be used for the majority of the cues to the horse. Overuse of any aid can be detrimental to the training of the horse, but in general harsh or rough hands are considered the worst crime a rider can commit using the natural aids. Mastering and refining these natural aids, often alongside artificial ones, constitutes a significant portion of a rider's challenge in achieving true competence. The natural aids include the legs, hands, weight, and voice.

The aids are used in a spectrum, from very light to very powerful, depending on the response desired. A very sensitive horse may readily jump forward from light touch of the leg, while a horse that is habituated to leg pressure may require a kick to get the same response. Additionally, an aid from canter to walk, for example, will use slightly more restraining aid on a particular horse than that horse would need going from canter to trot.

Positioning of the legs, seat, and hands are also used in a spectrum according to the individual horse and the response desired. For example, the aid for the canter depart may require the leg to be in a slightly different place than when it asks the horse to bend, or when it corrects hindquarters that are falling to the outside.

In all cases, good training aims for the horse to be responsive at the slightest cue, rather than requiring harsh aids to get a response. Responsiveness is mainly trained through the use of positive and negative reinforcement as well as classical conditioning. A well-trained horse may be harder to ride, as they will respond to the slightest movement or shift in weight made by the rider. They might interpret a mistake made by the rider as a cue to do something (such as a slight pinching of the legs as a cue to run forward, or a slight imbalance in the rider's seat as the cue to step sideways or speed up). Riders must therefore be sure that any perceived "disobediences" are not actually caused by their own doing.

Good training of the rider will aim to produce someone with an "independent seat", meaning someone who is able to give the aids independent of each other (without, for example, sitting forward while adding leg). The rider's first task is to learn to ride the horse without interfering: keeping a steady contact with the bit, sitting in a balanced, relaxed position that allows them to absorb the horse's movement, and keeping a steady, quiet leg that does not pinch, bounce, or push forward or back. Only then will the rider be able to really start to influence the horse in such a way to help it.

=== The leg ===
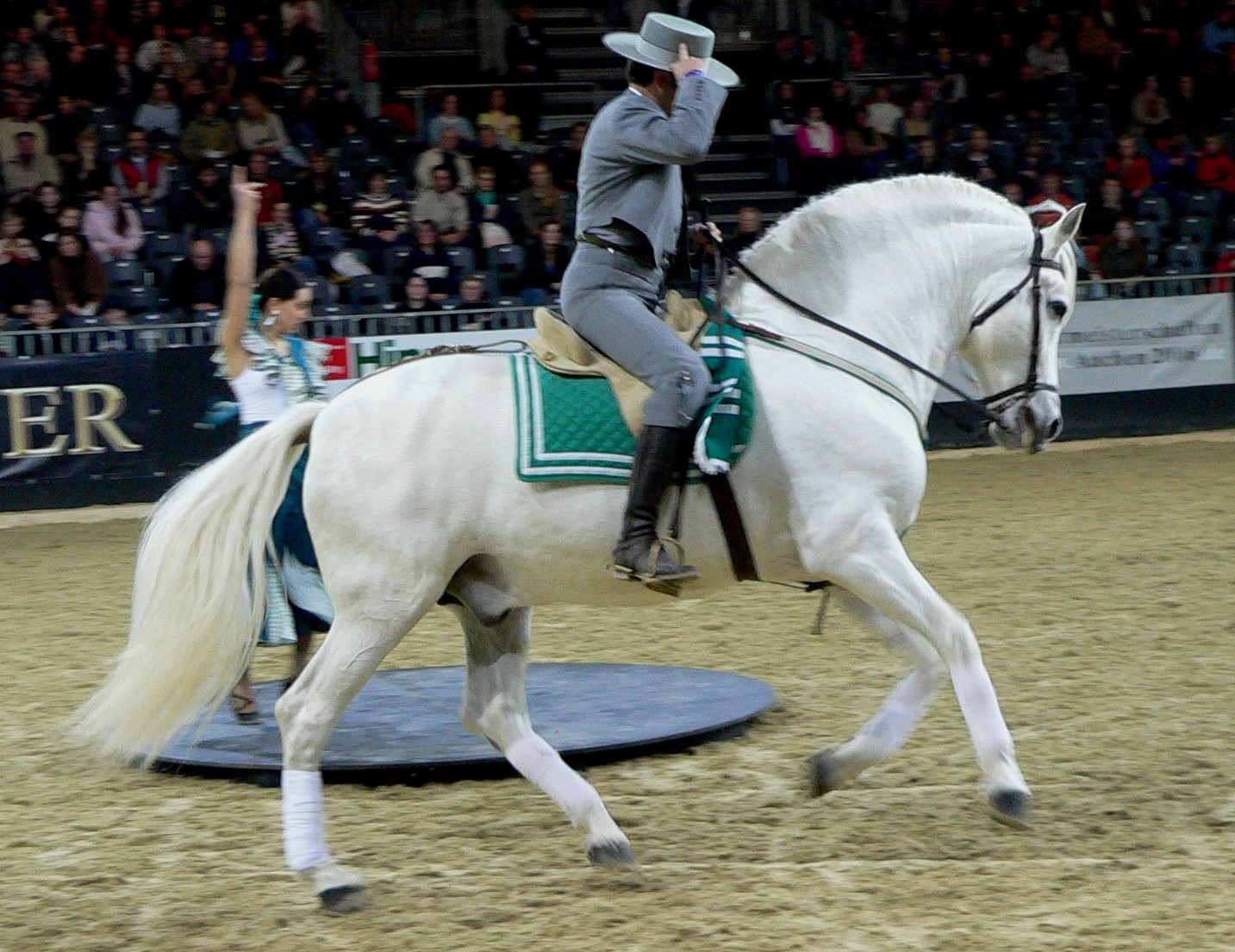
Using the leg aid slightly behind the "neutral" position, to keep the horse correctly bent on a circle. Note the majority of the aids to turn are given with the legs, not the hands.

The leg, along with the seat, should be the main aid for the horse. It has a great deal of control over the horse's hindquarters, and is used to ask the horse to go forward, increase impulsion (power), step sideways, and correctly bend. It is the primary "driving aid" (cue to ask the horse to increase forwardness or power).

Both legs in a neutral position (neither forward nor back), applying equal pressure against the horse's sides, generally asks for an increase in speed within their current gait or an upward transition (such as walk to trot). Depending on the level of restraining aids (seat and hands), the leg can also ask for an increase in impulsion, for collection, or even for the rein back. To ask a horse to back up, a rider simultaneously uses soft rein aids to keep the horse from stepping forward, but uses the legs to ask for movement, so the horse moves backwards. It is incorrect to ask for a rein back by pulling or jerking on the reins.

One leg in a neutral position, or slightly back from neutral, when applied more than the other leg, will ask the horse to step sideways from its pressure. Depending on the amount of restraining aids (seat and hands), this can cue various lateral movements, ranging from a leg-yield or half-pass, to a sidepass, to a turn on the haunches or turn on the forehand, to a pirouette.

One leg further back, in a supporting passive role, and the other leg in a neutral position, but active role, will ask the horse to bend toward the direction of the neutral leg. For example, on a circle going to the right, the rider will put his or her outside leg slightly further back, and use the inside leg at the neutral position to ask the horse to bend correctly through his body. This is also important when cueing for movements that require bend, such as the half-pass, or pirouette.

One leg farther back, with the other leg in a neutral position, both actively encouraging the horse forward, will usually aid the horse to canter. The horse will pick up the lead opposite the leg that is further back.

=== The hands ===
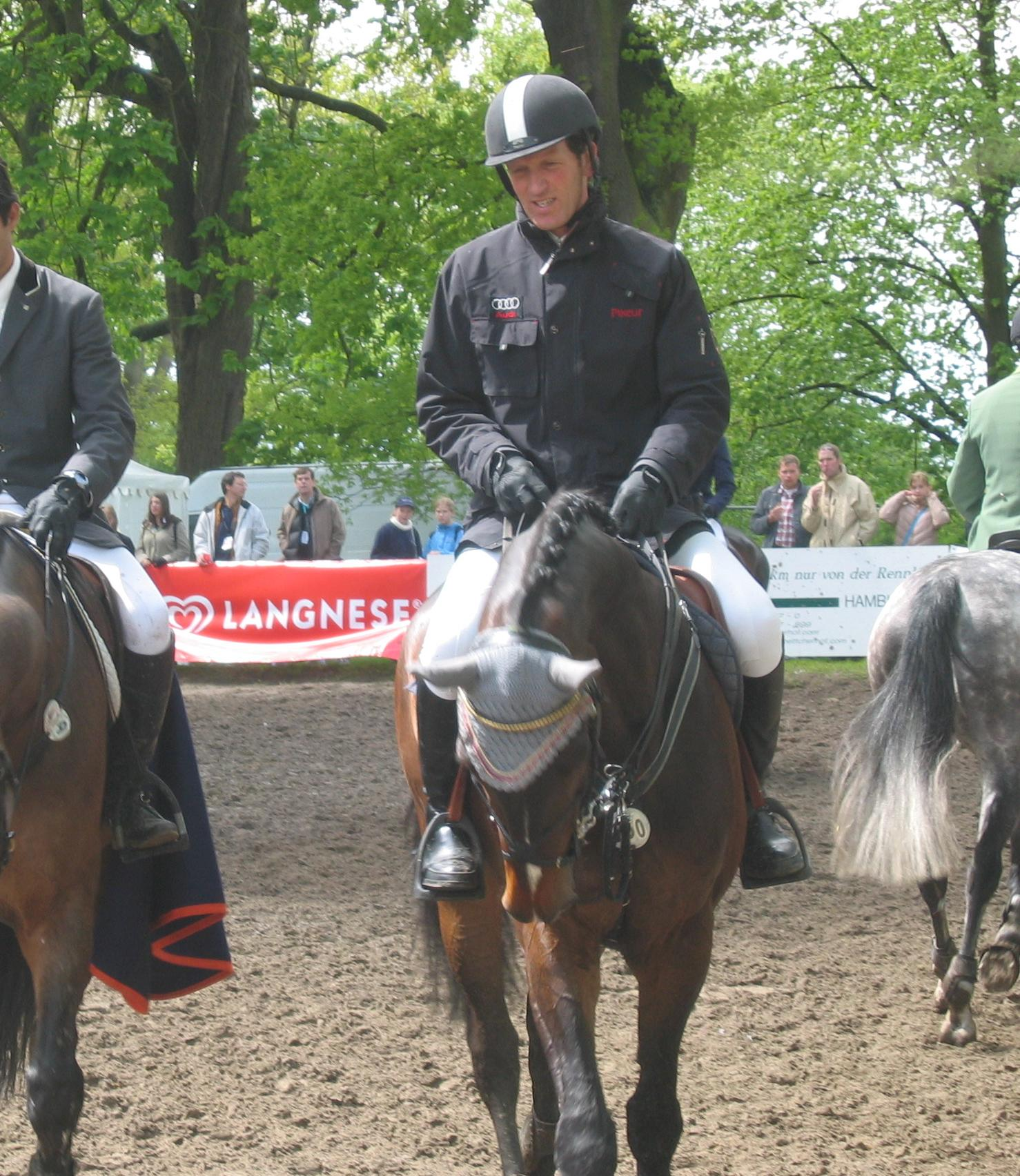
The rider's right direct rein bends the horse in that direction. It is supported by correct leg aids, with the inside leg at the girth and the outside leg behind.

The hands communicate to the horse through the reins to the bit. They have the most control over the horse's head and shoulders, and relatively little control over the animal's hindquarters. The hands are used for two main purposes: as a "restraining aid" (an aid that blocks or contains the forward energy of the horse) or as a guiding aid, encouraging the horse to go in a certain direction.

Both hands, pulling backwards and used together, act as a restraining aid. Depending on the amount of restraint the rider uses, this may ask the horse to halt, perform a downward transition, reinback, or bring his hind legs further under his body, increasing impulsion or collection. As a restraining aid, the hands should be used in conjunction with the legs. If the rider slows "all in the hands" (without any use of leg) he creates an unbalanced transition, with the horse on the forehand. This balance of leg and hand is something that must be learned by the rider, and most beginners will halt simply by pulling backwards on the reins.

One rein used more than the other can create a guiding effect. There are 3 main turning aids using the hands, in which the inside rein directs the horse in the direction of the turn. However, all should be used with an outside supporting rein, to keep the horse's shoulders straight, and to contain the energy.

- Direct rein: one rein pulls straight back, encouraging the horse to turn in the direction of pressure.
- Indirect rein or bearing rein: pulls back inward in the direction of the horse's outside hip, without crossing over the neck, though the rein may touch the inside of the neck. This is usually used to correct straightness problems in the horse's neck and shoulders, as well as for lateral movements such as haunches-in.
- Opening rein: does not pull back, but rather the rider moves his or her hands away from the horse's neck in the direction of the turn. This is especially useful if the rider wants to turn in the air when jumping a fence.
- Neck rein: Laying the rein against the outside of neck of the horse, usually to support an inside rein cue when both hands are used. Also used to turn a horse without bit contact.

Raising the hands causes the pressure of the bit to act more on the horse's lips (as opposed to bars of his mouth). Although this is not the usual position, it can be used occasionally as a training tool.

A harsh jerk upward with one hand (with the other firmly planted on the neck) is used in a technique called the "one-rein stop." This is an emergency technique, when the horse is running away with his rider and no other method will stop him.

Western-style riding employs the use of the neck rein. The rider, holding the reins in one hand, moves that hand one way or the other so that the reins put pressure on the neck of the horse to ask for a turn. The bit does not come into play. This technique is also used occasionally by English-style riders such as polo riders.

Like the leg aids, the severity of the hands can communicate different things. So a slight resistance (pull) backed up with the leg can act as a half-halt, whereas a larger resistance will communicate to the horse to halt.

=== The seat ===
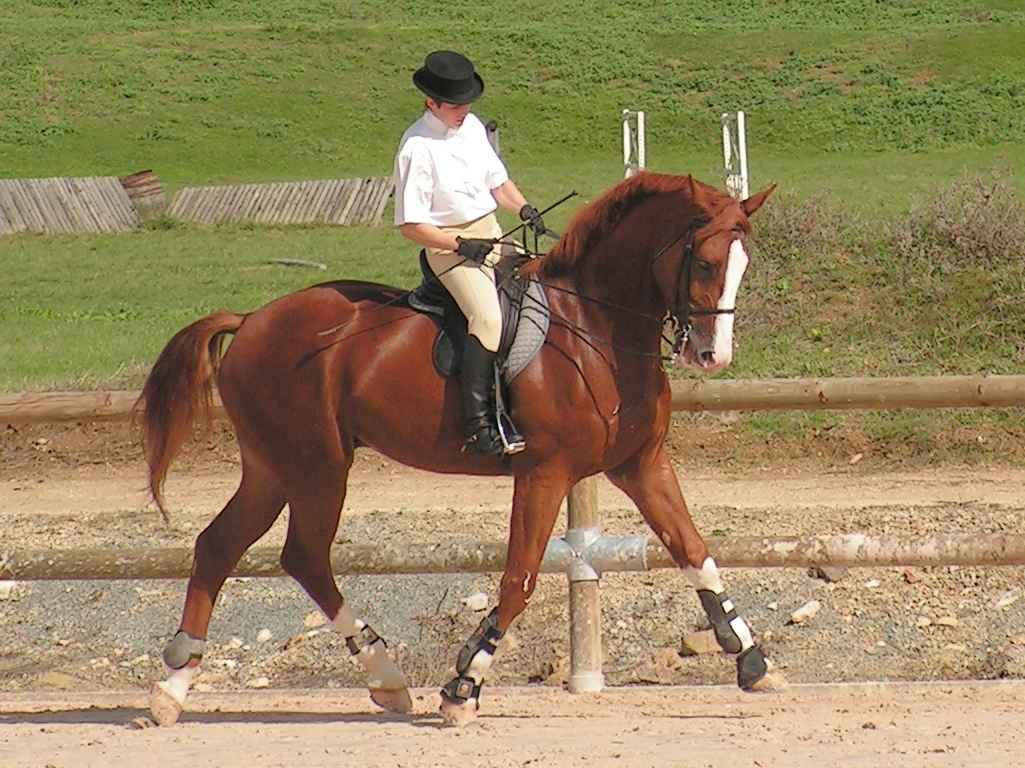
A driving seat.

Opinions vary on the definition of "the seat", but most agree that it includes the rider's hip region, including the seat bones and the pelvis, the thighs, all of which must be supple and balanced to correctly absorb movement. The seat is one of the more difficult aids to develop because the rider must first learn to relax and sit on the horse without bouncing or interfering with its movement before being able to learn how to apply the seat as an aid. The human centre of gravity is just above the pelvis. By tilting the pelvis very slightly backward (pulling the stomach in, but remaining a 'long upper body') the centre of gravity will shift and the horse will slow down or halt, depending on the horse and the degree of tilting. By pushing the pelvis half an inch forward, the centre of gravity will encourage the horse to move faster.

Most of the time, the seat stays in a neutral position in the saddle, neither restraining nor encouraging forward movement, simply following and absorbing the horse's motion. In general, the rider's hips should be placed so that they mimic the position of the horse's hips, and the rider's shoulders mirroring the position of the horse's shoulders. This allows the rider to follow the movement correctly, helps to keep the rider balanced in the saddle, and helps to guide the horse with minimal effort.

The seat can be used as a restraining aid, by temporarily stopping its following movement with the horse. This is usually used in conjunction with the hands, which is known as a half-halt, with some support from the legs.

By weighting one seat bone or the other, one can encourage bend in that direction. This should always be used with the inside leg asking for the horse to bend around it, and the outside leg providing impulsion for the bend. The hands also ask the horse to bend, with a slight direct or indirect rein. A more advanced form of this set of aids is seen in the half-pass, where the outside leg asks the horse to step over, the inside opening rein encourages that movement, and the inside seat bone and leg maintain the bend in the direction of travel.

One seat bone may also actively push forward and sideways into the horse, to encourage the canter depart. This is used in conjunction with the legs and hands in their appropriate places.

Lastly, the seat may be used as a driving aid, if the rider shifts their hips slightly backwards and pushes both seat bones into the saddle (as one would if pumping a swing). This technique is generally discouraged, as this is considered uncomfortable for the horse, causes a loss of suppleness through the hips for the rider, and the legs should be the primary driving aids.

=== Voice ===
The voice should be used very little under saddle as a cue, although depending on the horse being ridden it may often be an excellent aid in communicating with the horse if it is well utilized. It is sometimes used as a reprimand (such as a stern "no!"), or more commonly as a way to praise the animal. Certain verbal noises, such as "clucks", can be used as cues to encourage the horse to move forward, or soothing noises can calm an upset or nervous animal. In certain competitions (such as dressage), use of the voice is penalized, and overuse of voice in most types of competition is generally frowned upon. Despite the limited use of voice aids under saddle, spoken commands are very common when longeing.

Horses are very apt at learning verbal commands: "whoa", "walk", "trot", "canter" or similar words are quickly understood. The actual words usually do not matter, as long as they are consistent, though the tone of voice and the accenting of the word have an influence. A calming tone helps accentuate commands to slow down, an upbeat voice may emphasize commands to move forward. A kind voice tone may be helpful when praising a horse, and a harsh or growling tone when reprimanding. However, overuse of the voice (like overuse of any aid) can dull the horse to its effects. In general, it is best to rely on the leg, seat, and hands over the voice when riding. The primary role of the voice is to give the horse confidence.

Riding school horses, who hear instructors telling the pupils what do to, are sometimes known to obey spoken commands, which sometimes gives the false impression that the horse is obeying the rider. Likewise, experienced show horses will sometimes respond to the commands for changes of gait given by the announcer over the public address system rather than listening to their riders.

== Artificial aids ==
An artificial aid is anything used to communicate to a horse that isn't a natural aid. This would include whips, spurs, and supplementary equipment (beyond the basic bridle, bit and saddle) such as martingales or training rein systems. Artificial aids can be used to reinforce the natural aids, or to discipline the horse.

Spurs are attached to the rider's boots and are used to reinforce the rider's leg aids. Use can range from a brief light touch to a sharp jab. Whips and crops are usually carried across the rider's thigh. Even riders at the highest levels of competitive sport can carry whips. A running martingale can assist a rider to maintain control of a horse with a habit of resisting the bit by raising its head high. Many competition organizations have rules prohibiting artificial aids, such as limiting spurs (their style, length, and sharpness), or forbidding whips or martingales.

Artificial aids

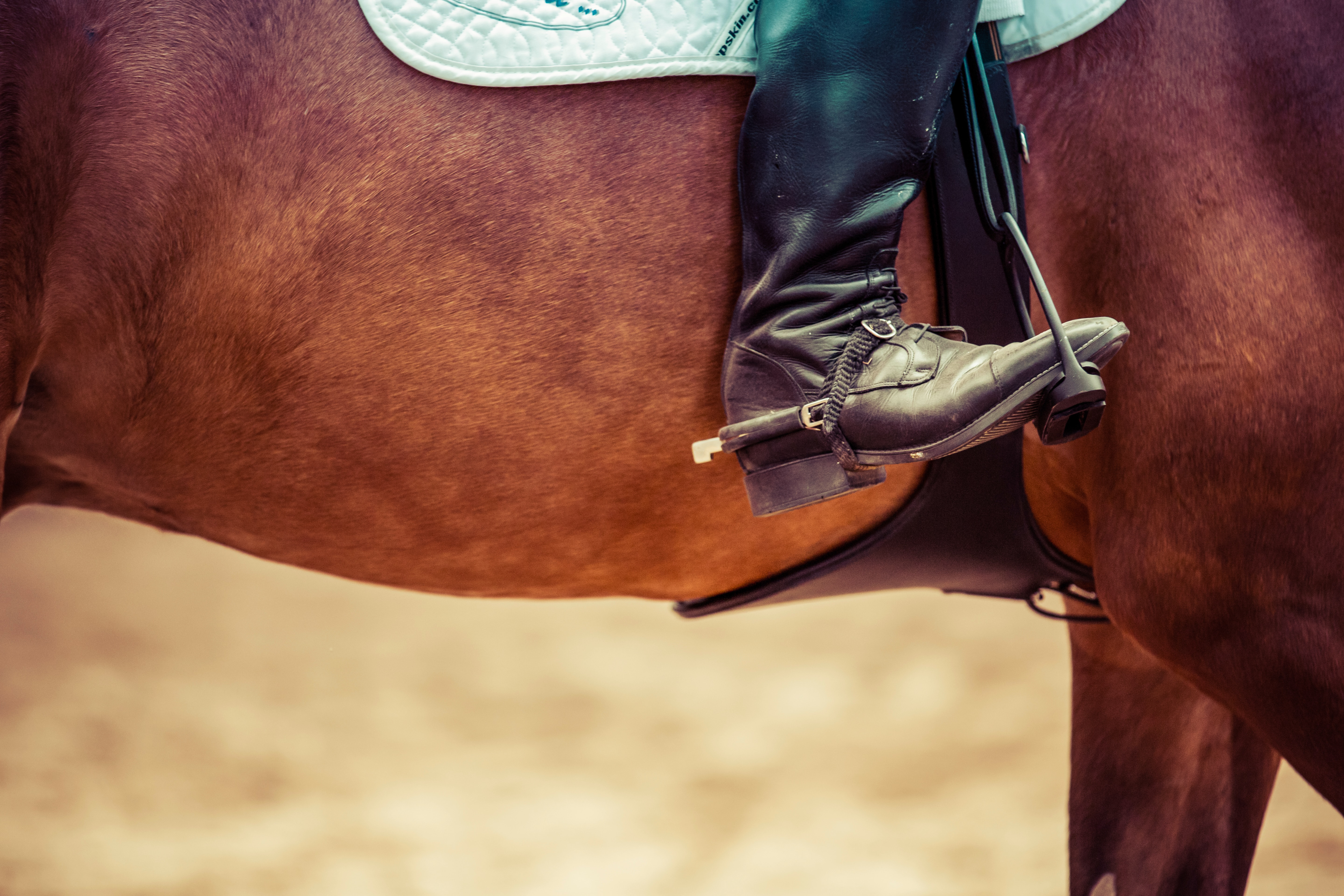
A spur added to a rider's boot

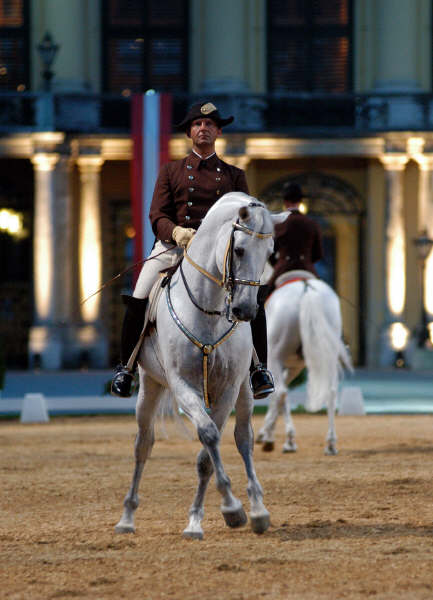
Whip carried across the thigh

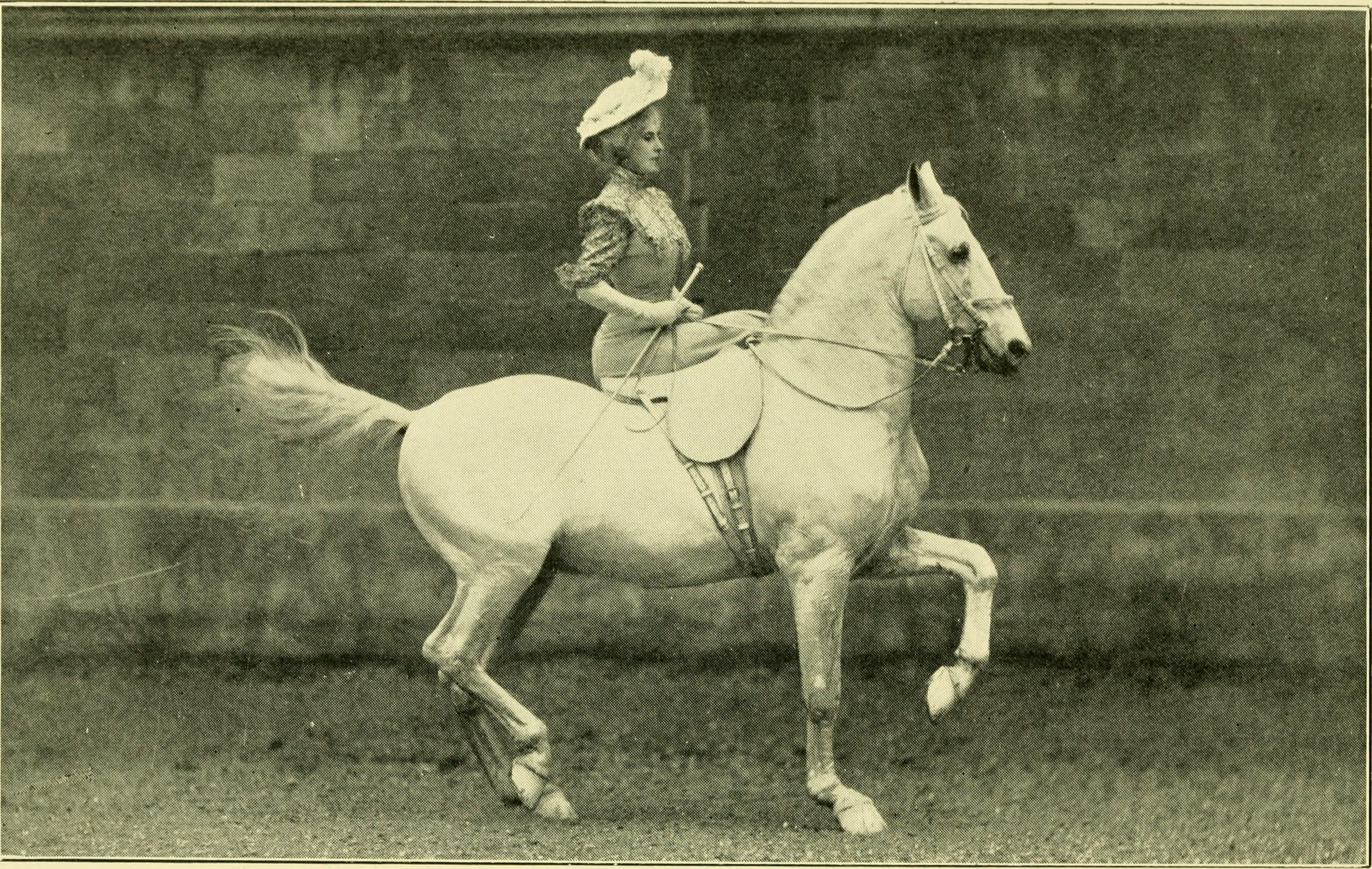
Sidesaddle riders use a whip to replace the missing right leg aid.

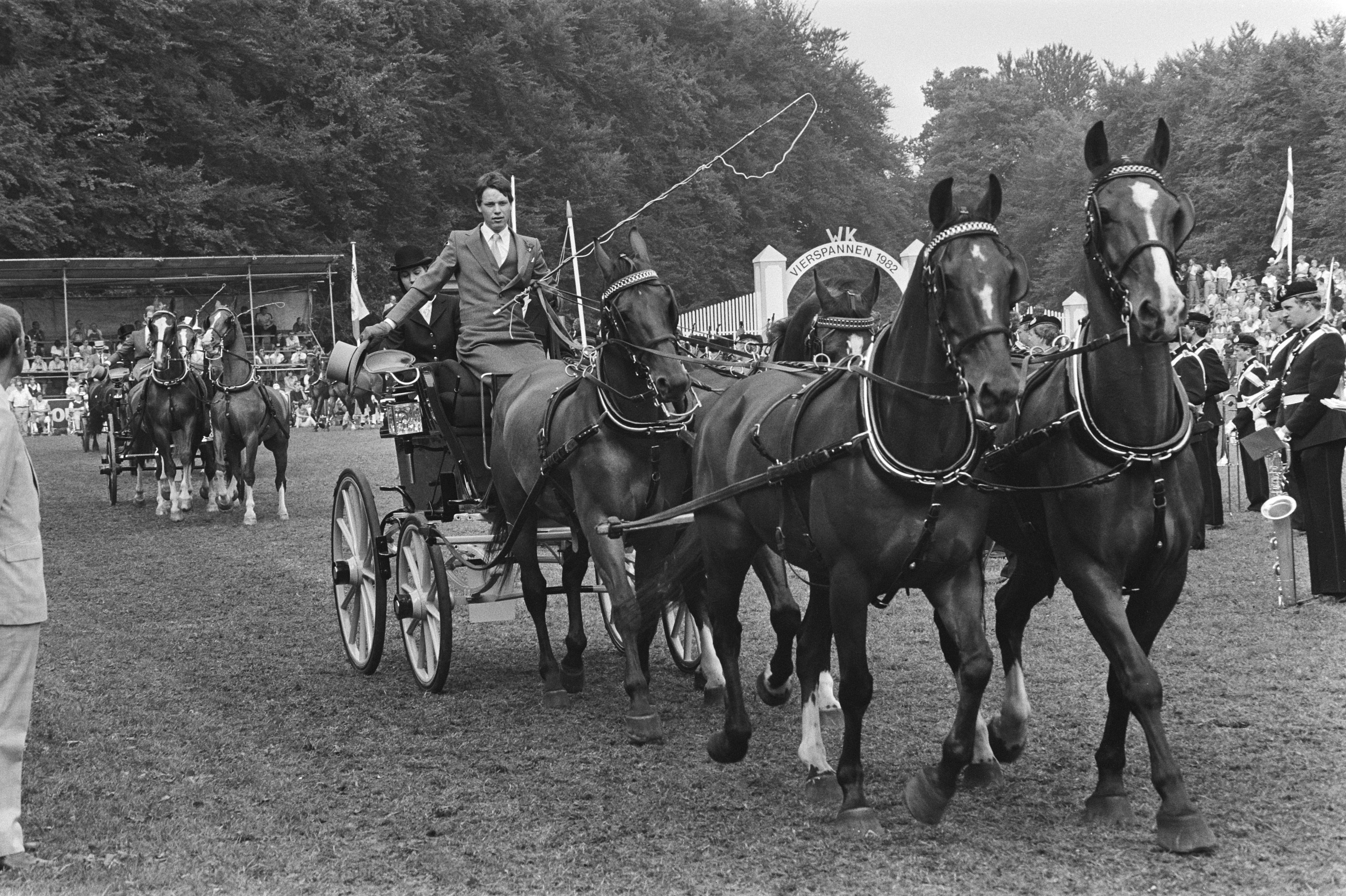
Drivers carry a whip because they cannot use leg aids at all.

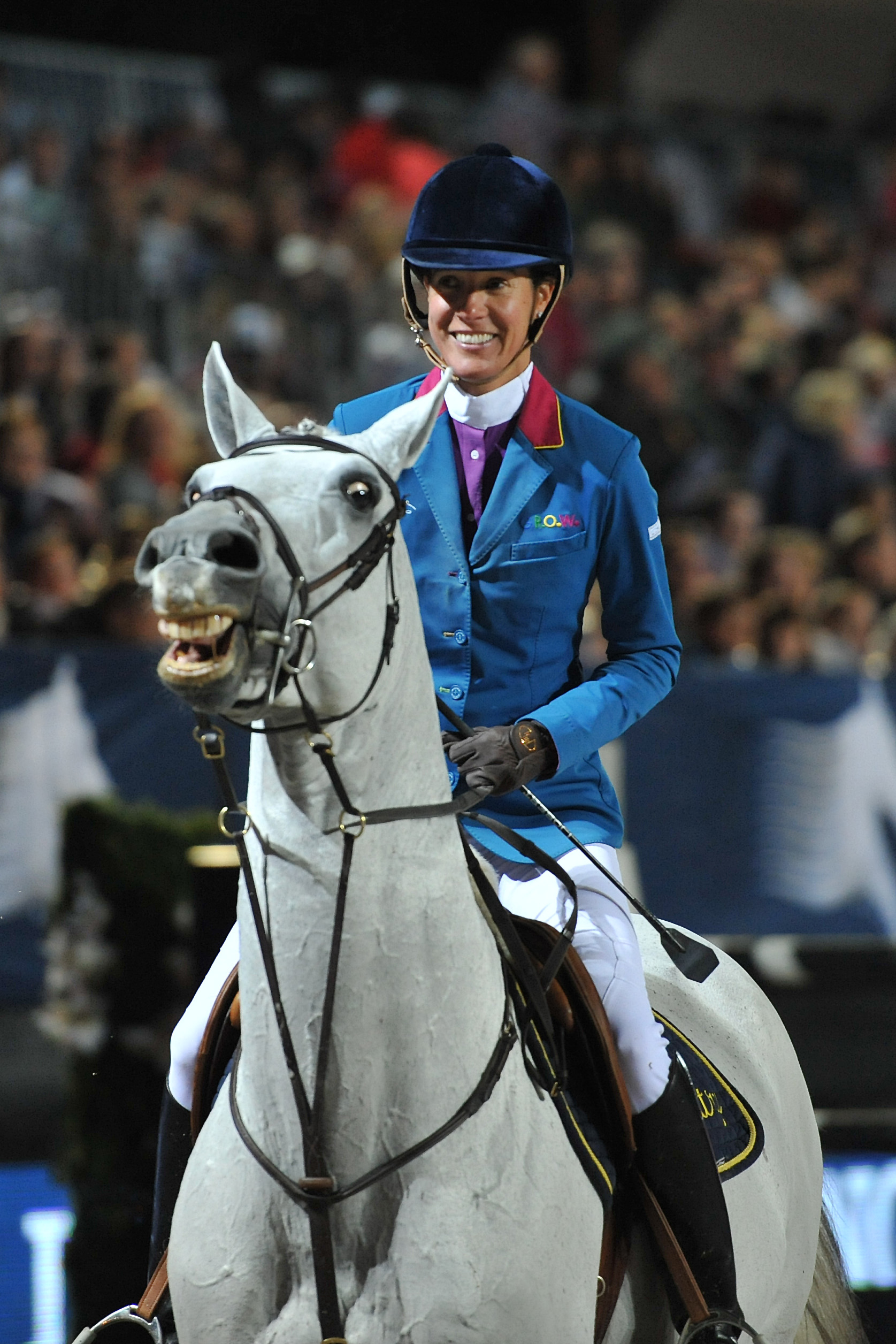
A running martingale helps with this resisting horse

== Conflicting aids ==
Conflicting aids occur when a rider makes two opposing requests to the horse at the same time. For example, a rider might ask for more speed using the leg aid, while simultaneously pulling on the reins, signaling the horse to slow down. In response, a horse can ignore one aid and favor the other. Very lazy-natured horses often respond by slowing down or stopping, ignoring the leg aid. Conversely, more energetic and eager horses may resist the bit but respond to the leg cue. Frequent use of conflicting aids can cause the horse to become desensitized to natural aids over time.
