= Rex Forehand =

American psychologist

- Born: Rex Lloyd Forehand; September 17, 1945 (age 80); Enterprise, Alabama
- Education: University of Alabama
- Spouse: Lell Harrell
- Children: 2
- Awards: Award for Distinguished Career Contributions to Education and Training in Psychology from the American Psychological Association (2008)
- Scientific career
- Fields: Psychology
- Workplaces: University of Georgia; University of Vermont
- Thesis: Rate of stereotyped body rocking as a function of frustration of goal-directed behavior and alternate activity (1970)

Rex Lloyd Forehand (born September 17, 1945) is an American psychologist. He is the Heinz and Rowena Ansbacher Endowed Professor and University Distinguished Professor of Psychological Science at the University of Vermont, where he is also the director of the Vermont Genetics Network. He previously taught at the University of Georgia for over thirty years, where he served as Distinguished Research Professor and, subsequently, as Regents Professor. He was also the director of the University of Georgia's Institute for Behavioral Research for nine years. In 2008, he received the Award for Distinguished Career Contributions to Education and Training in Psychology from the American Psychological Association.
