= Turn on the forehand =

Lateral horse movement around front legs

Turn on the forehand is a lateral movement in equestrian schooling that involves moving the horse's hindquarters around his front legs. Although a basic movement, it is an important training tool for both horse and rider.

== Movement made by the horse ==
It involves the horse's inside fore marking time on the spot. The outside foreleg moves forward very slightly and the hind legs move in a semicircle around the inside foreleg. A clear walk rhythm and sequence should be maintained throughout. During the turn, the horse's forehand should be prevented from moving forwards, sideways or backwards. When first beginning to teach this movement, the horse bends in the direction away from the movement of the hindquarters (so he bends to the left if the hindquarters are being pushed to the right). When he advances, he may be asked to have a very slight flexion in the direction of movement.

== Prerequisites ==
Turn on the forehand can only be of good quality if the horse is on the bit while maintaining clear walk steps in the 'lead up' to the halt that precedes the turn. In the halt he must be attentive, as if anticipating the rider's next commands. The only exception to this rule is for corrective purposes or if the horse is ready for collection.

If the horse understands the leg-yield, a review of that movement can be helpful in reminding him to move away from leg pressure, before he begins the turn on the forehand.

In an indoor school, the rider should choose a suitable place to execute the turn that is clear of obstructions and not too close to a wall, as this will hinder the horse as he makes the turn.

== How to perform the turn on the forehand ==
To ride a turn on the forehand, the rider should encourage a square halt by moving the horse leg-to-hand with proper riding aids, creating energy with the legs and containing the energy with the hands. When asking for the turn on the forehand, the inside and outside aids switch in relation to the new direction of the bend.

If bending the horse in the direction of movement, the rider switches his weight to the inside (direction of the turn) seatbone and, may ask for slight flexion toward the direction of travel with his inside rein. The outside rein prevents any forward movement and helps maintain proper bend. The rider's inside leg comes back slightly behind the girth to encourage the horse's hind leg to cross over. The rider's outside leg should be on the girth, receiving and regulating each step. When the turn is complete, the horse should be ridden forward with impulsion. It is important for the rider to sit tall, with his balanced centered in the saddle.

The aids should be relaxed slightly after each step, before asking for another, to reward the horse.

== Uses of the turn on the forehand ==
The movement can be beneficial to the horse, in that it improves form and encourages stretching and flexion of the inside hind leg. It teaches sideways movement from the rider's leg, introducing basic lateral concepts, from which more complicated lateral movements may be introduced, such as the half-pass. It also provides a good way of releasing stiffness and tension from the muscles.

For the rider, this exercise improves both coordination and application of the aids. It has practical use for helping the rider to open gates when trail riding or otherwise riding across rural lands.
