= Forehand (horse) =

Front half of a horse's body

The term forehand refers to the front half of a horse's body.

== Balance ==
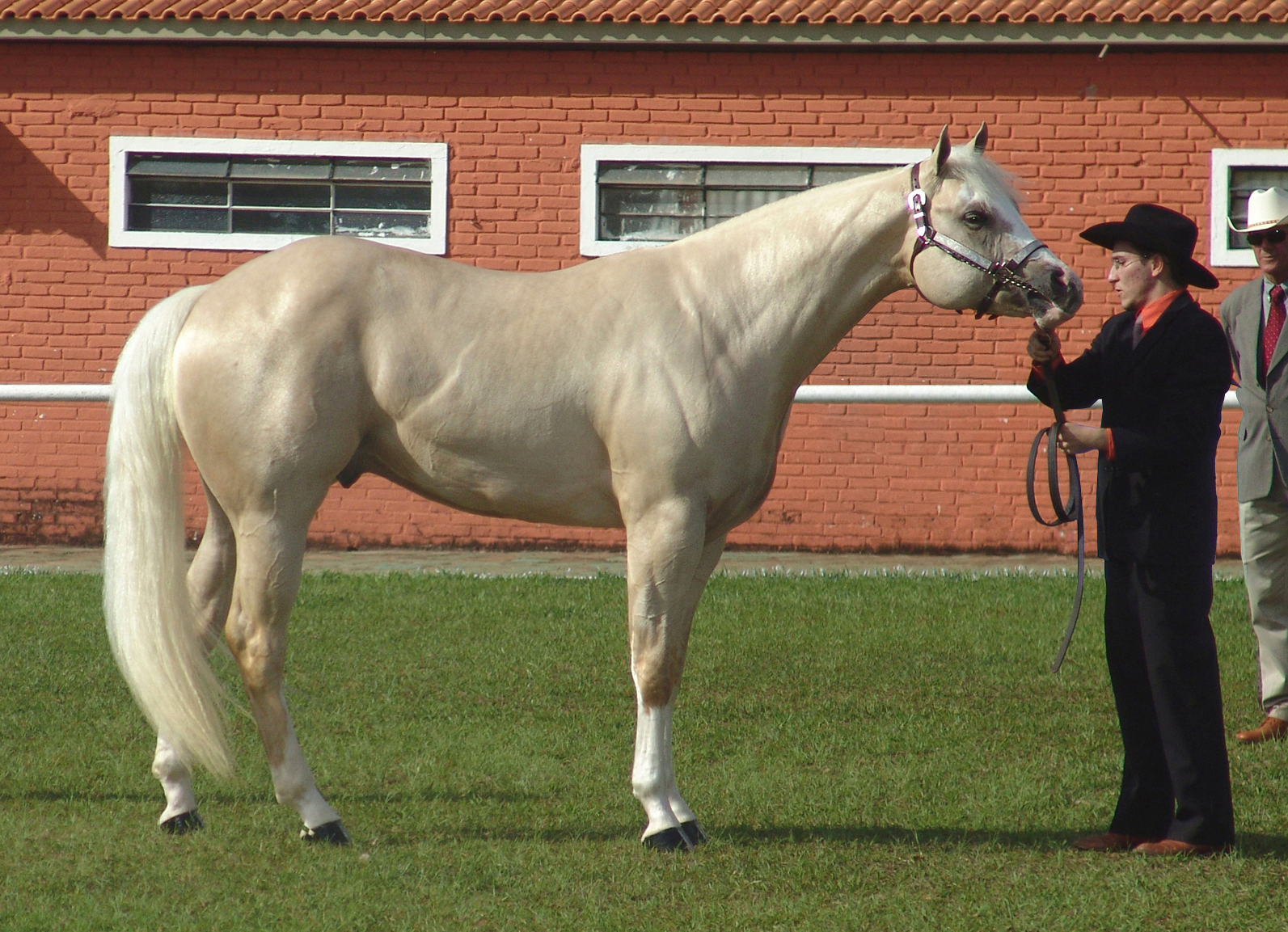
This horse, being built "downhill," will find it harder to shift the weight to the hind end.

A horse's "motor" is located in his hindquarters, and a horse that is heavy on the forehand (weight primarily on the forehand) is not able to properly move forward with impulsion. For good impulsion, a horse must either be balanced or have most of its weight tilted back toward its hindquarters.

Good riding aims to help transfer some of the animal's body weight back, getting the horse "off the forehand," but some riding disciplines require a greater amount of this transfer of weight (or "collection") than others. Sports such as dressage and show jumping require some of the greatest transfers of weight, while others, such as western pleasure, require a great deal less. However, it is beneficial for all horses to not travel "on the forehand," as this decreases the concussion placed on the front legs and their joints, thereby decreasing the risk of concussion-related lamenesses such as sidebone, ringbone, and others.

Certain conformational faults will encourage a horse to travel on the forehand, thereby making it more difficult for a rider to attain the shift in weight (although talented riders can usually train any horse to travel better with enough time). Horses that are built "downhill," with their hindquarters especially high, will be harder to collect.

== Anatomy of the forehand ==
=== Muscles, tendons, and ligaments ===
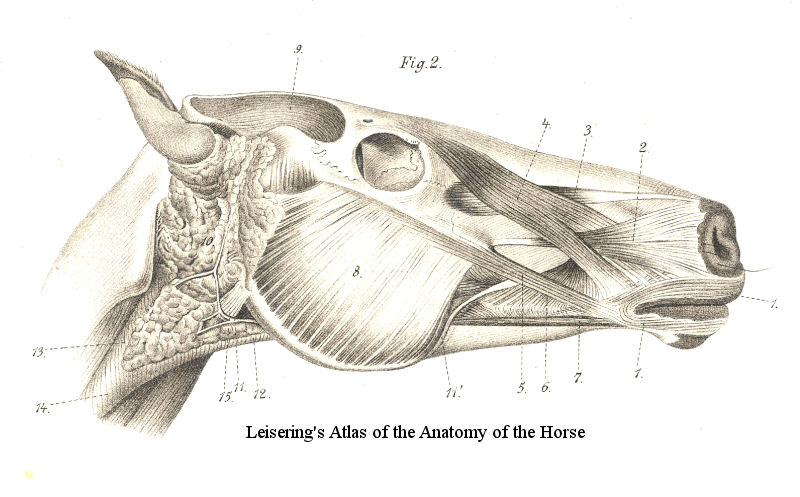

The masseter, or cheek muscle, opens and closes the jaw and allows chewing. The Brachiocephalicus is a wide strap-like muscle that begins at the base of the skull behind the jaw and ends below the point of the shoulder to the humerus. This muscle moves the head from side to side, pulls the scapula forward, raises it in collection, and swings the foreleg forward. It is well developed for good movement, and too strong a rein contact inhibits free forward movement. The Sternocephalic begins at the jowl and ends at the sternum. This muscle moves the head and neck. In ewe-necked or bull-necked horses, this muscle is overdeveloped, and is difficult to get into a relaxed shape. The Rhomboideus begins at the Nuchal ligament and ends at the scapula. It lifts the shoulder and forehand, and pulls the scapula forward. The Splenius begins behind the poll and ends at the beginning of the Trapezius. This muscle turns and extends the neck, and makes up the topline if well developed. The Trapezius is a flat, sheet-like muscle that begins at the Occipital bone and ends at the spines of the 7th cervical and all the thoracic vertebrae. It lifts the shoulder and forehand, and if this muscle is well developed, the horse will work in a good outline. The Nuchal ligament begins at the poll and ends at the withers, and helps the muscles in the neck support the head. The deltoid begins at the scapula and ends at the humerus. The deltoid flexes the shoulder joint, and will load the shoulder if overdeveloped. The Supraspinatus begins below the trapezius and ends at the point of the shoulder; it maintains the shoulder in extension. The Latissimus dorsi begins at the lower thoracic vertebrae and ends at the back of the humerus; it flexes the shoulder and pulls the foreleg back. The Triceps flex the shoulder and extend the elbow; the Biceps flex the elbow and extend the shoulder. The pectoral muscles help pull the foreleg forward. The Triceps Brachii extend the elbow joint; the Biceps Brachii flex the elbow joint. The Extensor carpus extends the knee. The Flexor carpus flexes the knee. The Digital extensor extends the toe and knee. The digital flexor flexes the toe and knee and extends the elbow.

== See also ==
- Muscular system of the horse
- Equine forelimb anatomy

== Reference Links ==
- Rara Equus
- Equiworld
