= Piber Federal Stud =

Lipizzan horse stud farm in Austria

Coordinates: 47°04′50″N 15°06′01″E

Piber Stud logo

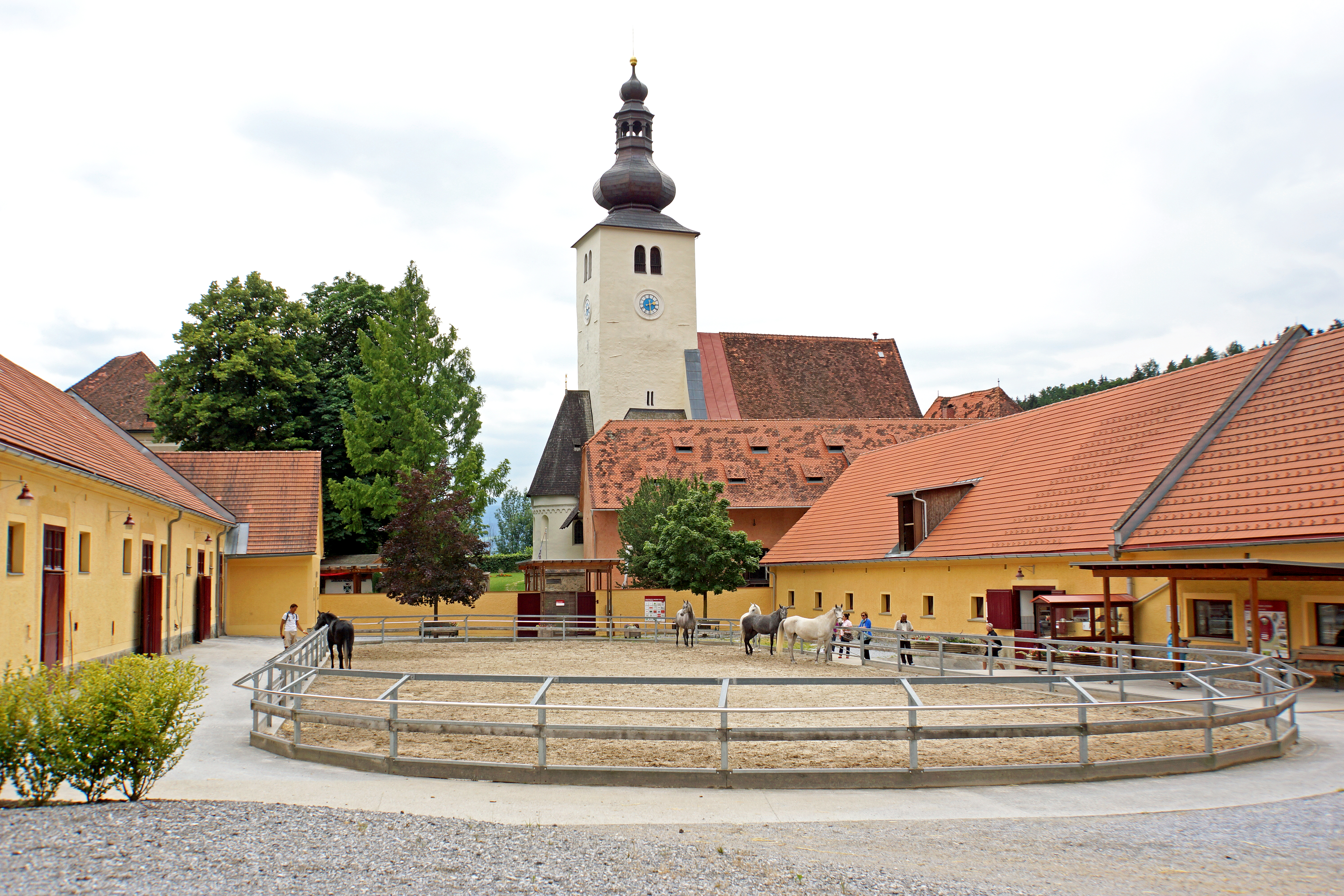
Riding Area and Stables

The Piber Federal Stud (Bundesgestüt Piber) is a stud farm dedicated to the breeding of Lipizzan horses, located at the village of Piber, near the town of Köflach in western Styria, Austria. It was founded in 1798, began breeding Lipizzan horses in 1920, and today is the primary breeding farm that produces the stallions used by the Spanish Riding School, where the best stallions of each generation bred at Piber are brought for training and later public performance. One of Piber’s major objectives is "to uphold a substantial part of Austria’s cultural heritage and to preserve one of the best and most beautiful horse breeds in its original form."

== History ==
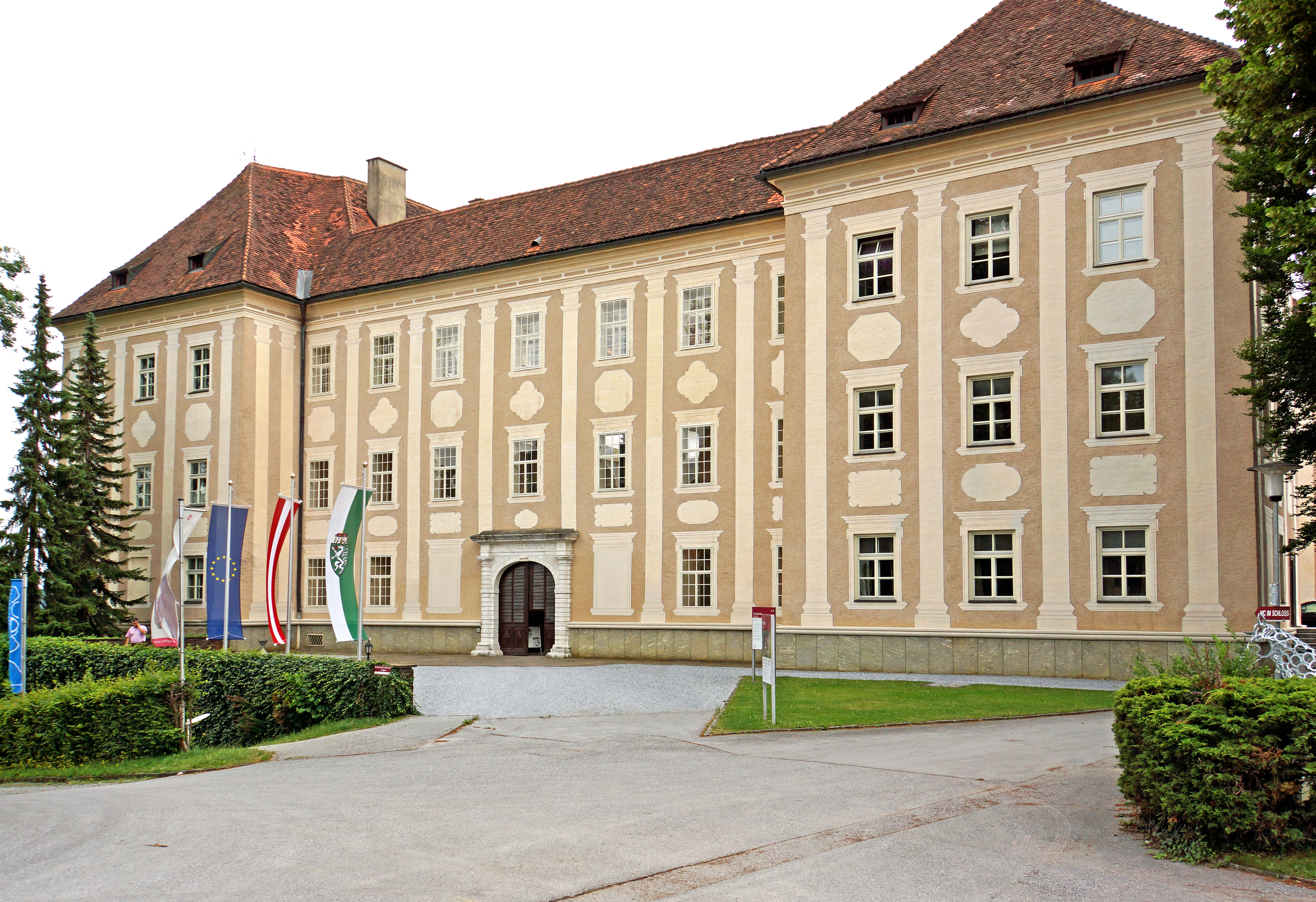
Piber Castle

Piber Castle was formerly the Abbey of St. Lambrecht. The stud was created 1798 for the purpose of breeding military horses. In 1867, it came under the governance of the Austro-Hungarian Imperial Ministry for Agriculture. In 1915, at the beginning of World War I, the Lipizzan horses from the Court Stud at Lipica (today located in Slovenia) were evacuated and placed at Laxenburg and Kladrub. Following the war, the Austro-Hungarian Empire was broken up, with Lipica becoming part of Italy. Thus, the animals were divided up between several different studs in the new postwar nations of Austria, Italy, Hungary, Czechoslovakia, Romania and Yugoslovia. The nation of Austria kept the stallions of the Spanish Riding School and some breeding stock. By 1920, the Austrian breeding stock was consolidated at Piber.

During World War II, the high command of Nazi Germany transferred most of Europe's Lipizzan breeding stock to Hostau, Czechoslovakia. The breeding stock was taken from Piber in 1942. By spring of 1945, the horses at Hostau were in danger from the advancing Soviet army, which may have slaughtered the animals for horsemeat had it captured the facility. However, the Third Army's United States Second Cavalry, a tank unit under the command of Colonel Charles Reed, had discovered the horses at Hostau, where there were also 400 Allied prisoners of war, and had occupied it on April 28, 1945. "Operation Cowboy," as the rescue was known, resulted in the recovery of 1,200 horses, including 375 Lipizzans, General George S. Patton learned of the raid, and arranged for the director of the Spanish Riding School, Alois Podhajsky to fly to Hostau. On May 12, American soldiers began riding, trucking and herding the horses 35 miles across the border into Kotztinz, Germany. The Lipizzans were eventually settled in temporary quarters in Wimsbach, until the breeding stock returned to Piber in 1952.

Piber, and the Lipizzan breed as a whole, suffered a setback to its population when a viral epidemic hit the Piber Stud in 1983. Forty horses and eight percent of the expected foal crop were lost. Since then, the population at the stud has increased, with 100 mares at the stud as of 1994 and a foal crop of 56 born in 1993. In 1994, the pregnancy rate increased from 27% to 82% as the result of a new veterinary center.

== Today ==
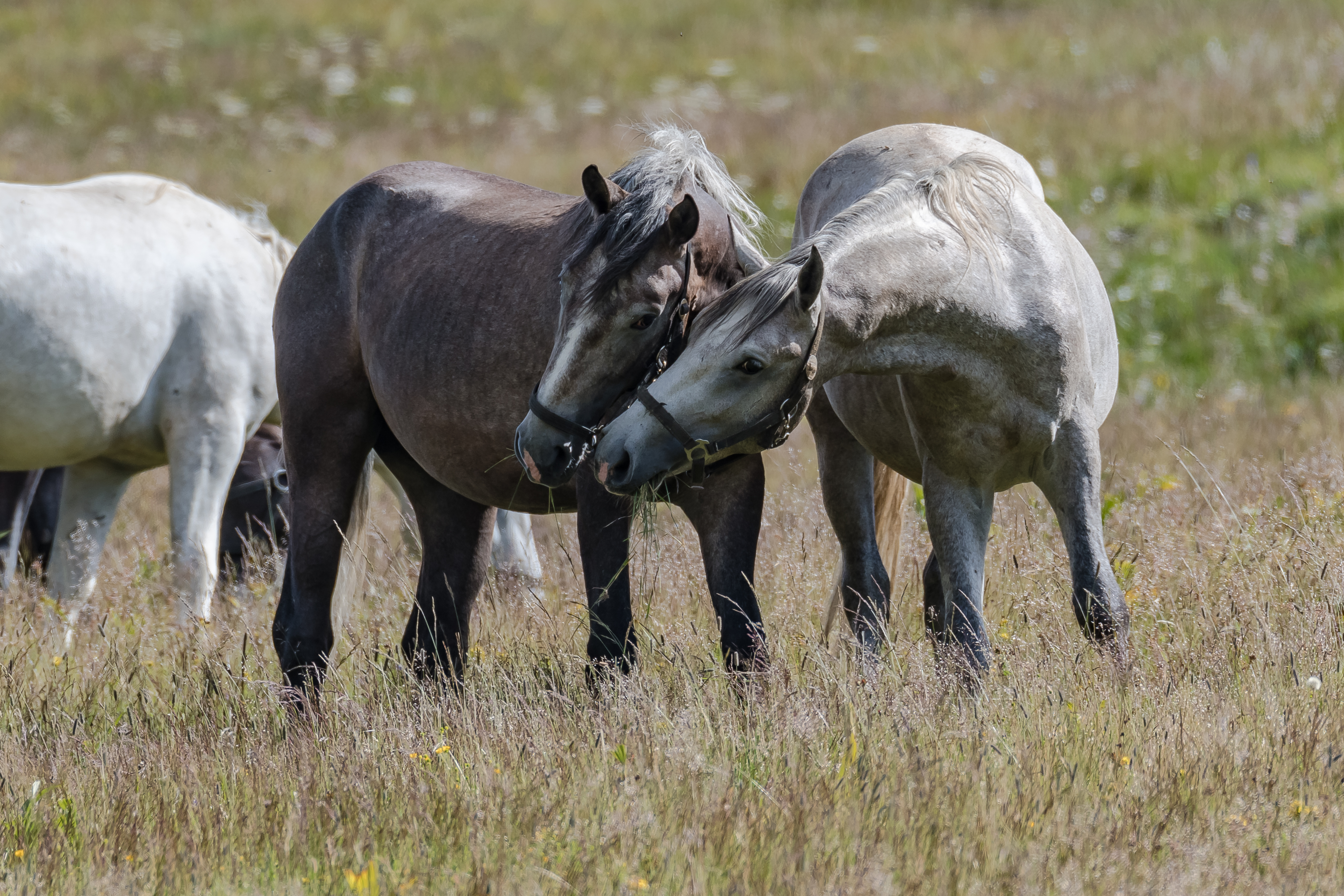
Young stallions at pasture

In 2001, the Spanish Riding School and the Piber Federal Stud were spun off from government support and together became a public company. though the owner is still the federal government of Austria. In 2003, the province of Styria held an Exhibition entitled "The Mythical Horse." This resulted in extensive investments in the stud's infrastructure and allowed the stud to become a venue for holding both equestrian and cultural events. The facility has a staff of 52, and hosts approximately 60,000 visitors a year.

The Piber stud and Piber castle are marketed together as tourist attractions. Visitors can watch training sessions with the horses in the riding arena, visit the stables, and take part in special programs for children. There are also cultural and musical events in the castle courtyard, which has excellent acoustics. Carriage rides are available, and the baroque buildings on the ground are available for concerts, festivals and weddings.

== Breeding program ==
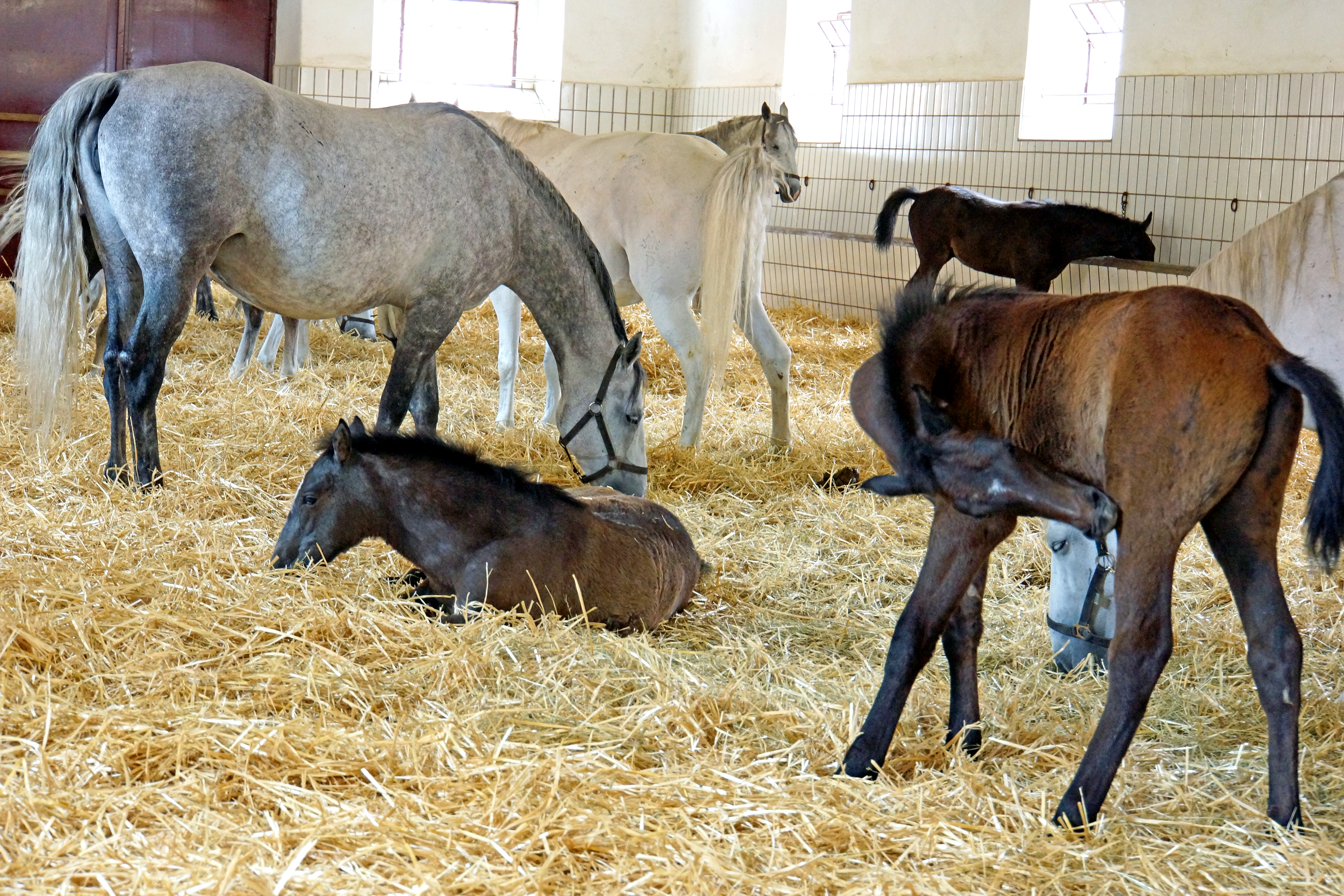
Lipizzan mares and foals at Piber

The Piber Federal Stud is 555 hectares in size. Approximately 250 horses are kept there, including 70 broodmares. Two stallions from the Spanish Riding School are brought to Piber each breeding season. Only stallions from the Spanish Riding School are used as breeding stallions, and all six classic stallion bloodline families are used. Approximately 40 foals per year are born at Piber. Young horses grow up in a herd and spend their first three summers on alpine pastures. Meticulous records are kept on every horse from the moment of their birth to the completion of their training.

The Piber Federal Stud is the only location containing foundation bloodstock from all 15 classically recognized mare families. The facility includes stables for stallions, but also extensive grazing and pastures. At the age of four, selected stallions come to Vienna, while the others are sold. After several years of training in Vienna, the stallions chosen for breeding purposes come back to Piber. To avoid inbreeding, Piber works in cooperation with other Lipizzan stud farms in Slovenia, Hungary, Slovakia, the Czech Republic and Romania, to periodically exchange breeding stock.

To help support the breeding program, Piber offers an "adoption" program where individuals and corporations can sponsor an individual animal with an annual monetary donation.

== Future trends ==
The Spanish Riding School also has facilities for a summer retreat for the stallions of the school. Although it was commonly thought the stallions of the school went to Piber for the summer, only the few used in a particular breeding season are taken to Piber. The summer retreat for most stallions of the school was elsewhere. For many years, they went to the Lainzer Tiergarten, where the horses were kept in the stables of the Hermesvilla. Since 2005, the school stallions spend their summer in Heldenberg near Vienna, in Lower Austria. This current summer stable will be expanded into a new year-round facility to provide additional capacity for training more young Lipizzaner stallions in the Haute Ecole of Classical Dressage than has been possible in the past.

== See also ==
- Lipizzan
- Spanish Riding School
