= Selmice =

- Municipality
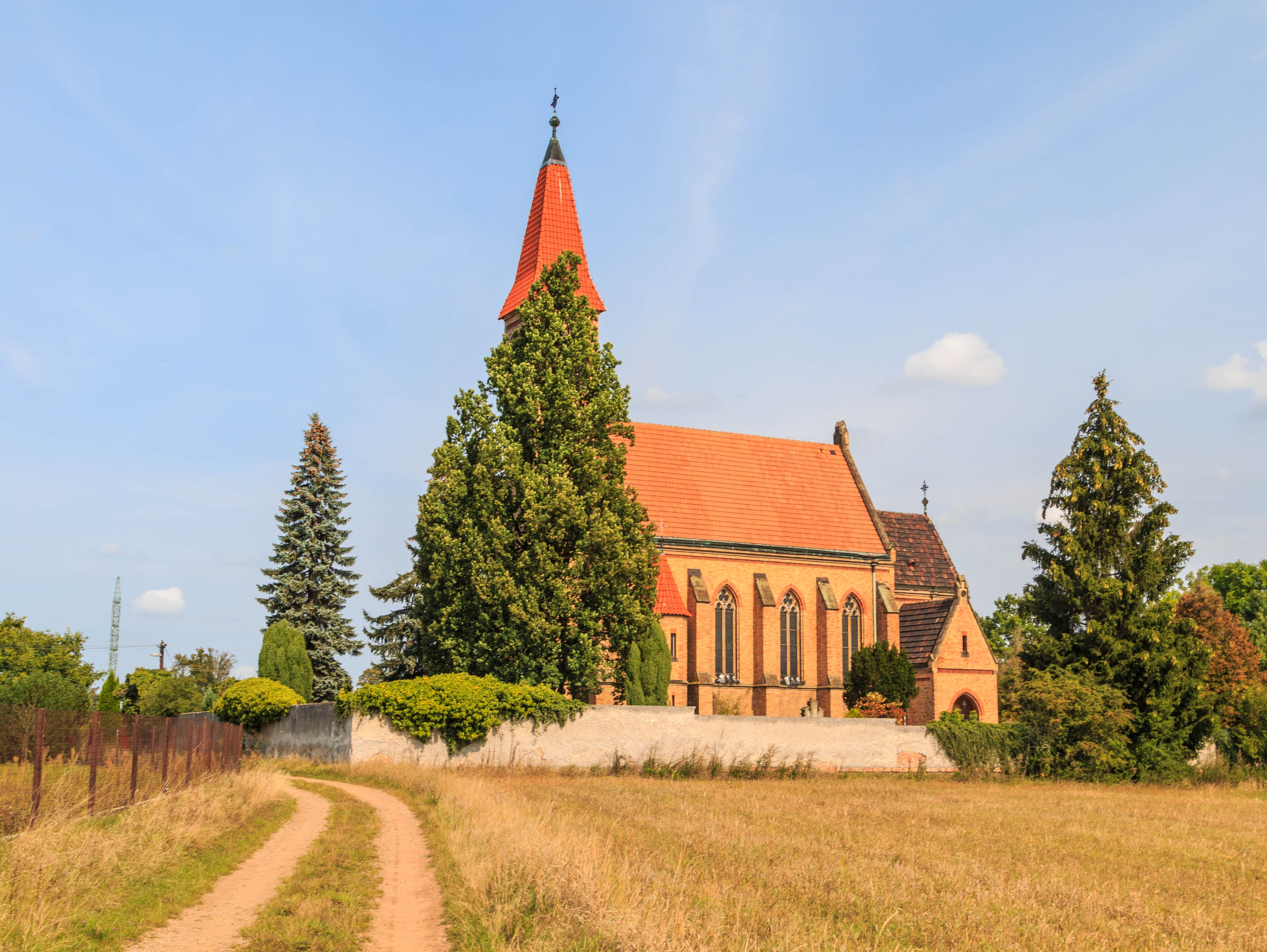
- Church of Saint Lawrence

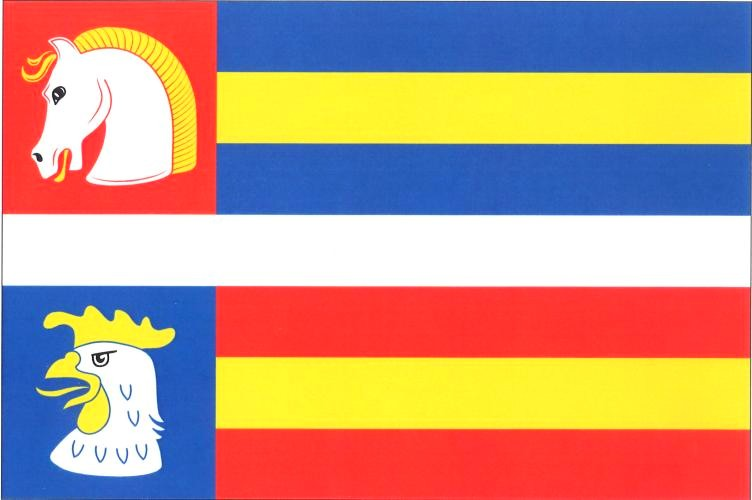
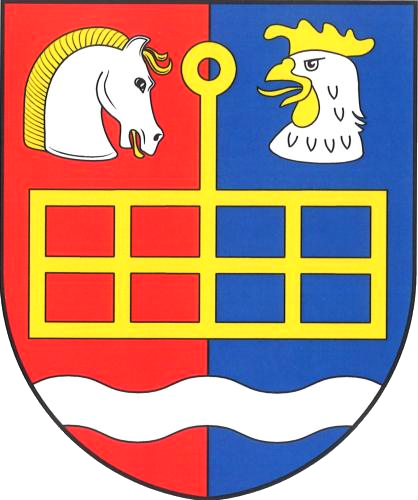
- Flag Coat of arms

- Location in the Czech Republic
- Coordinates: 50°3′0″N 15°26′27″E
- Country: Czech Republic
- Region: Pardubice
- District: Pardubice
- First mentioned: 1142

Area
  - Total: 5.43 km^{2} (2.10 sq mi)
- Elevation: 205 m (673 ft)

Population (2026-01-01)
  - Total: 152
  - Density: 28.0/km^{2} (72.5/sq mi)
- Time zone: UTC+1 (CET)
  - Summer (DST): UTC+2 (CEST)
- Postal code: 535 01
- Website: www.selmice.cz

Selmice (German: Selmitz) is a municipality and village in Pardubice District in the Pardubice Region of the Czech Republic. It has about 200 inhabitants. The area of the village is included in the Landscape for Breeding and Training of Ceremonial Carriage Horses at Kladruby nad Labem, a UNESCO World Heritage Site.

== Demographics ==
Historical population
Year	Pop.	±%
1869	259	—
1880	286	+10.4%
1890	259	−9.4%
1900	268	+3.5%
1910	289	+7.8%
1921	275	−4.8%
1930	268	−2.5%
1950	222	−17.2%
1961	226	+1.8%
1970	206	−8.8%
1980	166	−19.4%
1991	137	−17.5%
2001	133	−2.9%
2011	235	+76.7%
2021	144	−38.7%
Source: Censuses
