= Ernst Lindenbauer =

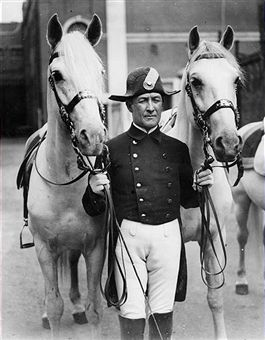
Chief Rider Ernst Lindenbauer with two Lipizzan stallions.

Ernst Lindenbauer (18 November 1881 Lichtenegg/Wels – 22 April 1961 Vienna) was Chief Rider from 1919 - 1950 at the Spanish Riding School in Vienna.

Lindenbauer was born in Lichtenegg/Wels, Upper Austria, the son of a farmer. He took his first riding lessons at the age of 13. He had considerable natural talent, so after he finished school in 1895, he became a student at the stables of Archduke Franz Salvator in Lichtenegg, where he was instructed in riding, driving and other aspects of handling horses. During his apprenticeship, Lindenbauer learned not only to school horses in dressage, but did also horse racing and drag hunting.

In 1900, he volunteered for military service in the "6th Dragoon Regiment" in Wels, returning after three years to the service of Archduke Franz Salvator. From there he moved to Vienna, where on November 20, 1906 he entered the Imperial Campaign Riding School (Hofstallungen) as a student (Hofreitskolar). Later he was promoted to a Class II and then a Class I rider (Bereiter). During his time there, Lindenbauer trained young horses for the program (Hofmarstall) and he occasionally had the opportunity to train a few horses for Emperor Franz Josef that were used for parades and maneuvers.

In 1919, Lindenbauer was posted to a position at the Spanish Riding School. He was then promoted to Chief Rider (Oberbereiter) in 1926. In that position, he played a substantial role in the preservation of the Spanish Riding School in the difficult interwar period as Central Europe changed from a monarchy to a republic. Although he was a quiet and introverted individual, he was one of the mainstays of the Spanish Riding School in his time.

== Sources ==
- Podhajsky, Alois. "Deutsche Reiterhefte", Berlin 7. November 1941
- Podhajsky, Alois. "My Horses, My Teachers" (excerpts) Doubleday & Company, Inc., Garden City, New York. 1968
