= Spanish Riding School =

Traditional riding school in Vienna

Coordinates: 48°12′27″N 16°21′58″E

- Spanische Hofreitschule
- Location: Vienna, Austria
- Chief Stable Master: Andreas Haipl
- Website: http://www.srs.at/

The Spanish Riding School (German: Spanische Hofreitschule) is an Austrian institution based in Vienna, dedicated to the preservation of classical dressage and the training of Lipizzaner horses, whose performances in the Hofburg are also a tourist attraction. The leading horses and riders of the school also periodically tour and perform worldwide. It is one of the "Big Four", the most prestigious classical riding academies in the world, alongside the Cadre Noir, the Portuguese School of Equestrian Art, and the Royal Andalusian School.

== Location ==
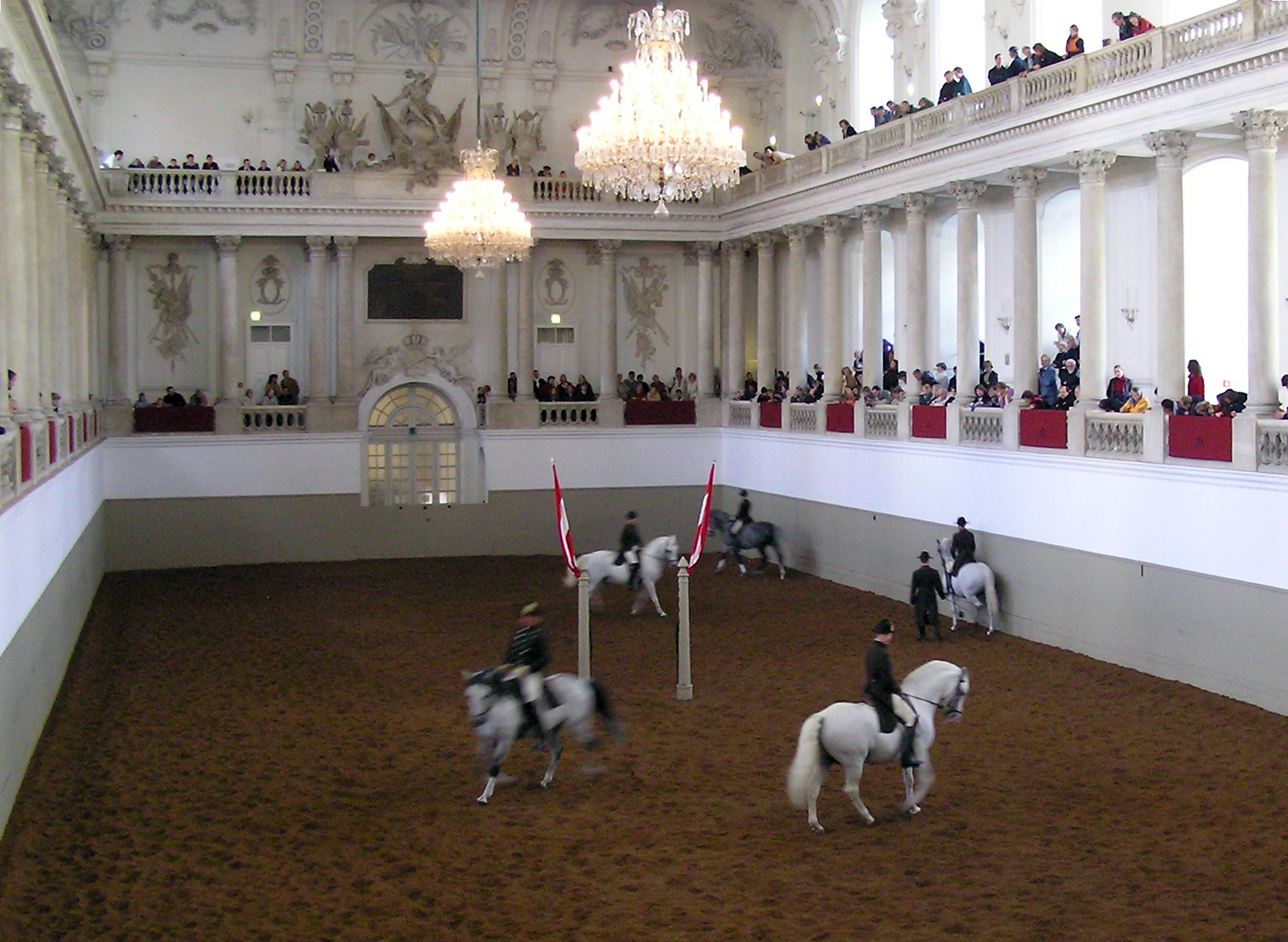
Spanish Riding School Lipizzaners performing in the Winter Riding Hall.

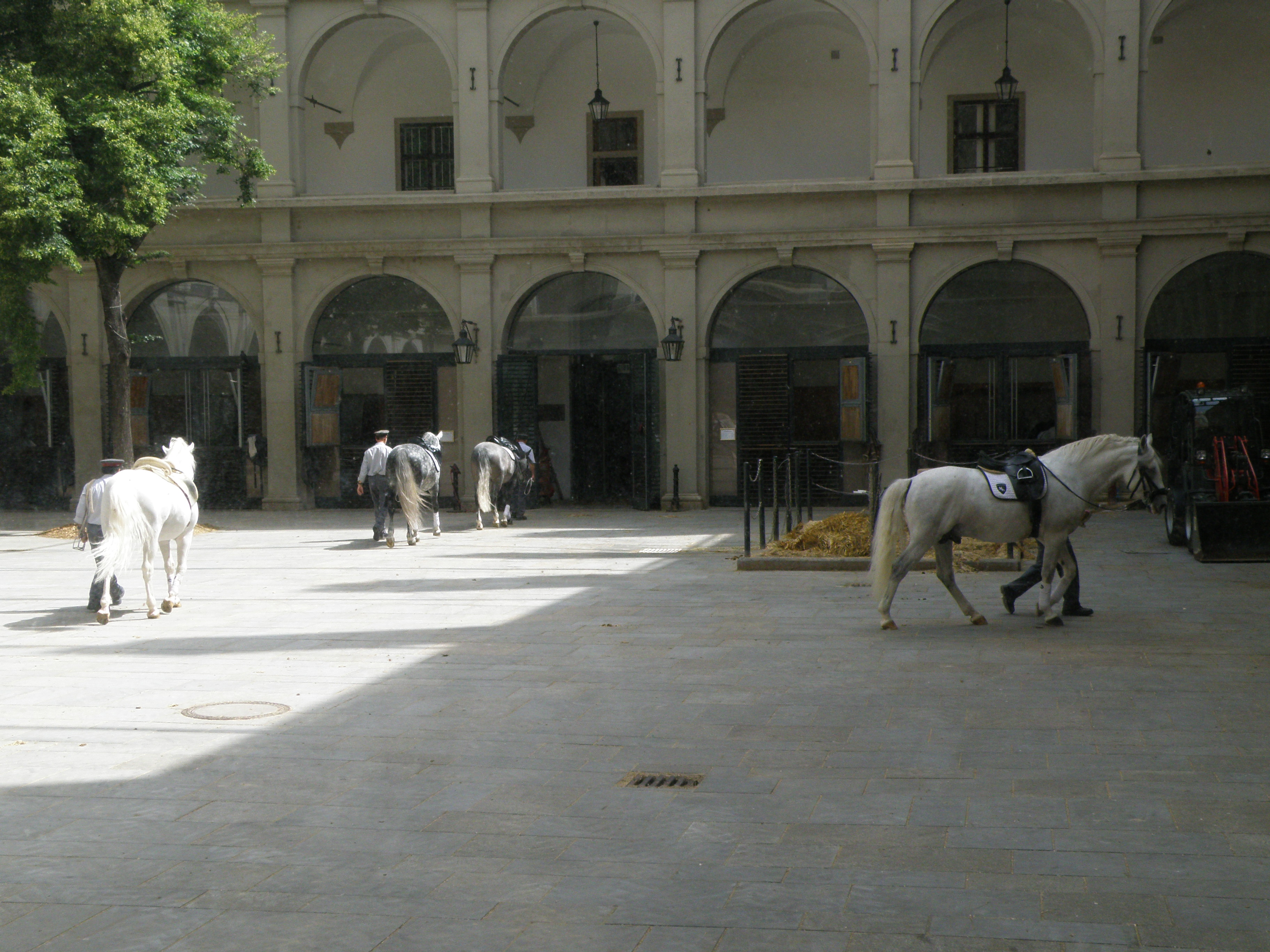
Lipizzaner horses returning to stables after training. The stables are located next to the Spanish Riding School arena in Vienna, Austria, where the Lipizzaner stallions perform.

The Spanish Riding School is located between Michaelerplatz and Josefsplatz inside the Hofburg in central Vienna. Performances take place in the Winter Riding School, built between 1729 and 1735. The hall of the Winter Riding School is mainly white with some beige and light grey. A portrait of Emperor Charles VI is located above the royal box and opposite the entrance (to which the riders always salute before they ride). The hall measures 55 by 18 metres (180 by 59 ft) and is 17 metres (56 ft) in height.

The Spanish Riding School also has summer stables in Heldenberg-Wetzdorf-Lower Austria. The 68 resident stallions are taken there in July and August for seven weeks, where they are kept in stalls with paddocks. The horses are not schooled during this period, but instead are hacked in the nearby forest.

== History ==
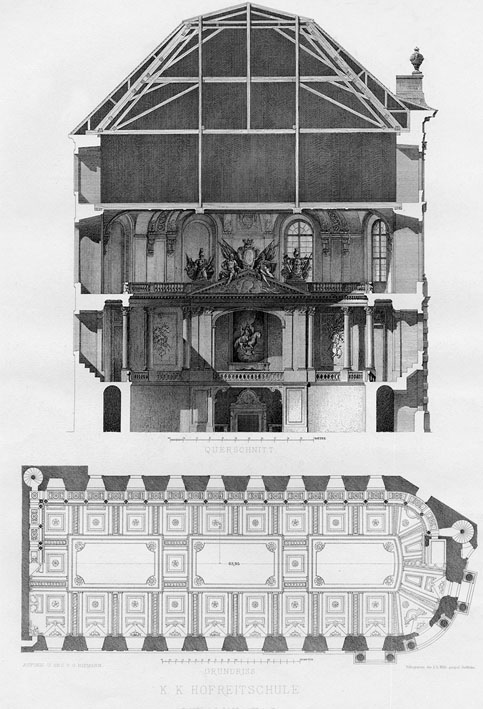
Winter Riding School

The riding school was first named during the Habsburg Monarchy in 1565, long before the French manege of Antoine de Pluvinel, and is the oldest of its kind in the world. Records show that a wooden riding arena was first commissioned in 1565, but it was not until 1729 that Emperor Charles VI commissioned the architect Joseph Emanuel Fischer von Erlach to build the white riding hall used today. Prior to that time, the school operated from a wooden arena at the Josefsplatz. For a time, the riding hall was used for various ceremonies, but it is now open to the public, who may witness the training and performances by the stallions.

The Spanish Riding School was named for the Spanish horses that formed one of the bases of the Lipizzan breed, which is used exclusively at the school. Today the horses delivered to the Spanish Riding School are bred at the Piber Federal Stud located near the village of Piber in western Styria, Austria. One of the original studs used to develop the breed was Lipizza, now called Lipica, near Trieste in modern Slovenia, which gave its name to the breed.

The Spanish Riding School has antecedents in military traditions dating as far back as Xenophon in Ancient Greece, and particularly from the military horsemanship of the post-medieval ages when knights attempted to retain their battlefield preeminence by shedding heavy armor and learning to maneuver quickly and with great complexity on a firearms-dominated battlefield.

Traditionally, Lipizzaners at the school have been trained and ridden only by men, although the Spanish Riding School states that there has never been an official ban on women. In October 2008, two women, Sojourner Morrell, an 18-year-old from the United Kingdom, and Hannah Zeitlhofer, a 21-year-old from Austria, passed the entrance exam and were accepted to train as riders at the school.

== Methods ==
The methods used by the Riding School are based on François Robichon de la Gueriniere. It is a common myth that the movements were developed to aid in battle; in fact, they were used to strengthen the war horse's body and mind and make him a supreme athlete, not to actually attack. All movements are based on those naturally performed by the horse when at liberty, with the exception of one-tempi changes.

The stallions are taught in three stages:

1. Remontenschule: ("forward riding") This stage begins when the horse is first brought to the Spanish Riding School as a 4-year-old. The stallion is taught to be saddled and bridled, and is started on the longe to teach him the aids, to improve his obedience, and to strengthen his muscles in preparation for a rider. Work on the longe includes transitions between the walk, trot, and canter, and changes of tempo within the gait, and lasts 2–3 months before a rider is ever placed on the animal's back. After longeing, the horse is ridden in an arena on straight lines, to teach him to respond correctly to the rider's aids while mounted. The main goals during this time are to develop free forward movement in the ordinary (not collected or extended) gaits, with correct contact and on a long rein, and to begin to cultivate straightness. Additionally, the training should have improved the animal's strength and stamina to prepare him for the next stage.
2. Campagneschule: ("campaign school") The horse is usually ready for the second stage after a year of riding in the first stage, although this time-frame is always adjusted to the individual horse. Young stallions are always placed with experienced riders during this second stage, to help prevent the development of bad habits due to incorrect work. During this time, he is taught collection, and is ridden in turns and circles at all gaits. The main purpose of this phase is to develop impulsion, improve the natural paces, promote self-carriage, make the horse supple and flexible, and gradually develop the muscles of the horse. The horse will learn to bend correctly in the neck, body, and at the poll as appropriate for his conformation. It is during this time that the majority of training takes place, and the horse learns to shorten and lengthen his gait and perform lateral movements, with most of the work taking place at the trot. This phase requires the most time of the three, generally two-thirds of the total time it takes to produce the "finished" horse. Before the end of this phase, the stallions are introduced to the double bridle, to refine the rider's aids.
3. Hohe Schule: ("high school" or Haute Ecole) In this stage, the rider will gradually push the horse to perfection in straightness, contact, suppleness, collection, and impulsion, to produce improved gaits. Through this work, the horse will learn to perform some of the most difficult movements such as pirouette, passage, piaffe and One-Tempi-Changes. Many of the exercises first taught in the Campaign school are utilized in this phase, focusing on the quality of the work and using them to help teach the more difficult exercises. The stallions are then assessed to determine if they are suitable for the demanding "airs above the ground," the final step in their training. Once they are chosen, the horses are taught their most-suitable school jump, first on the ground and then under saddle.

The riders, too, are carefully schooled. They first work on the longe without stirrups and reins on well-trained horses for up to 3 years, to teach a balanced and independent seat. They are then allowed to control the animals themselves, under the eye of an experienced rider, until they can perform the high school movements. With intensive training, this will take 2–4 years. The rider is then allowed to train a young stallion from unbroken up to High School, a process that usually takes 4–6 additional years.

== Performances ==
Performances at the Spanish Riding School were originally only presented to guests of the Court, and then when they were finally opened to the general population at the turn of the century, it was only for special occasions. However, after the fall of the Austro-Hungarian empire in 1918, the school opened up regular performances to the general public to help pay for its upkeep.

The original performances were quite short, with the chief riders presenting stallions in the High School movements, airs above the ground, work in-hand and exercises on the long rein, and then a Pas de Deux (two horses in mirror image) and a four-rider Quadrille would finish the performance.

The program today has expanded. It begins with the "Young Stallions" which have recently arrived from the stud farm at Piber. They demonstrate the first phase of training, in which the horse moves forward and accepts the aids. The next section is the "All Steps and Movements of the High School" where four fully trained stallions perform each of the movements seen in the Olympic Grand Prix Dressage test, including the flying change, passage, pirouette, and piaffe. The horses are ridden in double bridle, to demonstrate their high level of training. The "Pas De Deux" is then shown, with two horses demonstrating High School movements in mirror image.

The next section is the "Work in Hand", to show how the horses are trained for the school jumps levade, capriole, and courbette, all in-hand. This demonstration includes work on the diagonal, on the wall and between the pillars. All stallions wear a snaffle bridle, cavesson, side reins, some on short hand rein, some with a short longe. All carry the traditional white saddle of the school. Then one stallion is then worked "On the Long Rein", in which a fully trained Lipizzan performs all the movements it would be asked to do under saddle. In this section, the horse wears a red snaffle bridle and a red shabrack (saddlecloth) with the golden coat of arms of the Austrian Empire.

The "Airs Above the Ground" follows; all horses are under saddle, but the riders do not have stirrups. Movements performed include the levade, capriole and courbette. The performance finishes with the "School Quadrille", consisting of 8 riders working in formation at the walk, trot, and canter, with flying changes, pirouettes, the half pass and the passage. The ride is performed to classical music. Lasting 20 minutes, the School Quadrille of the Spanish Riding School is the longest and most difficult in the world.

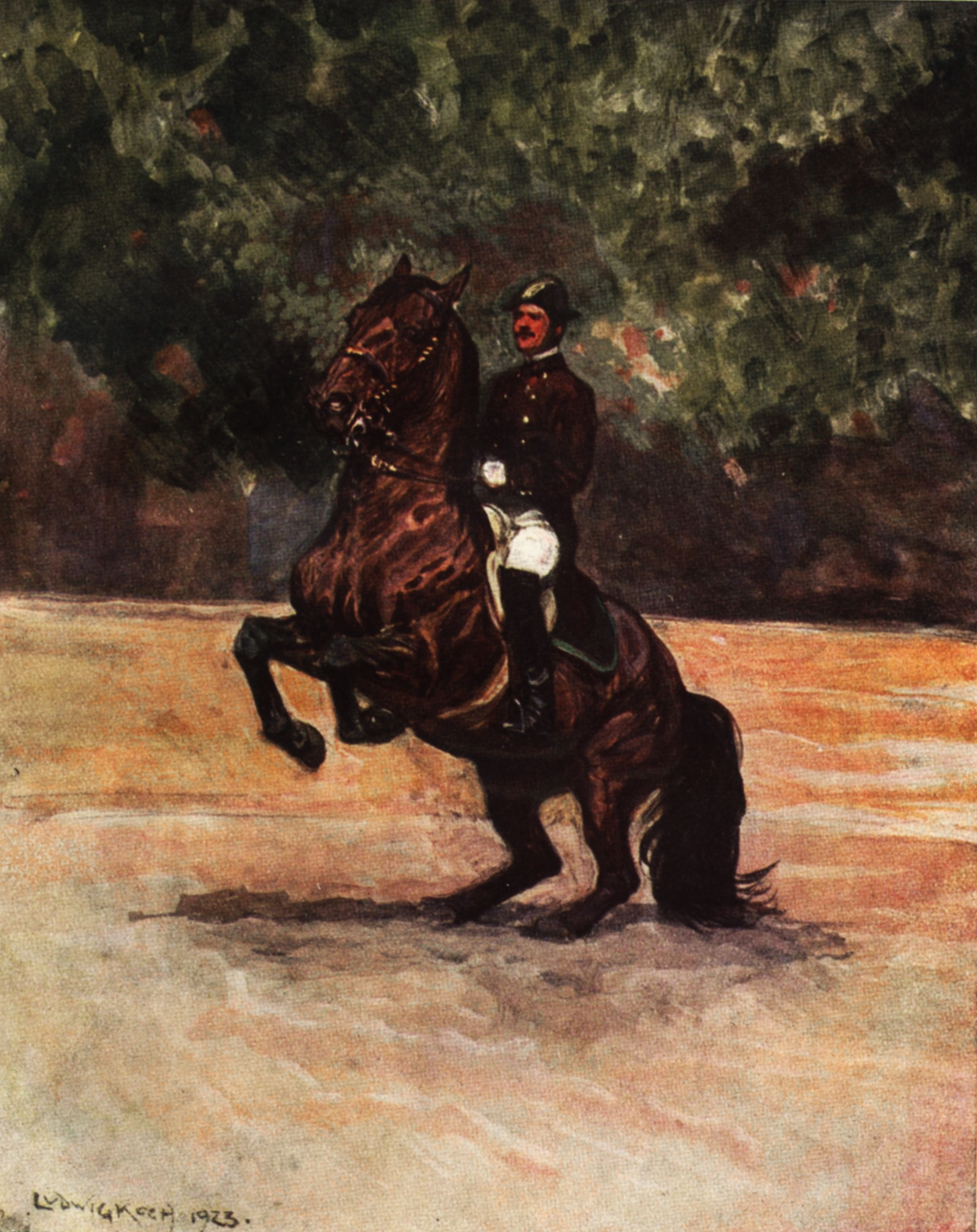
Levade

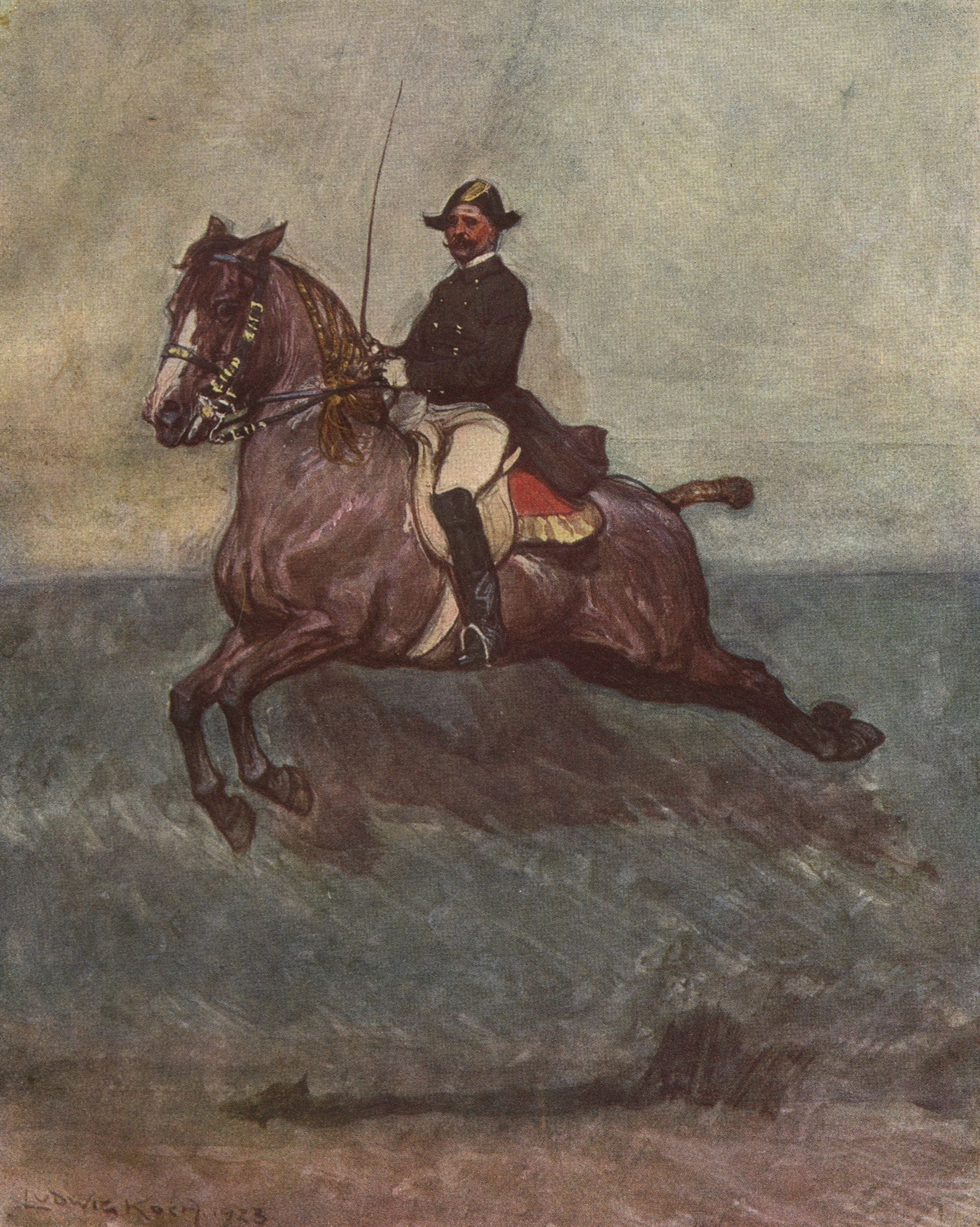
Capriole

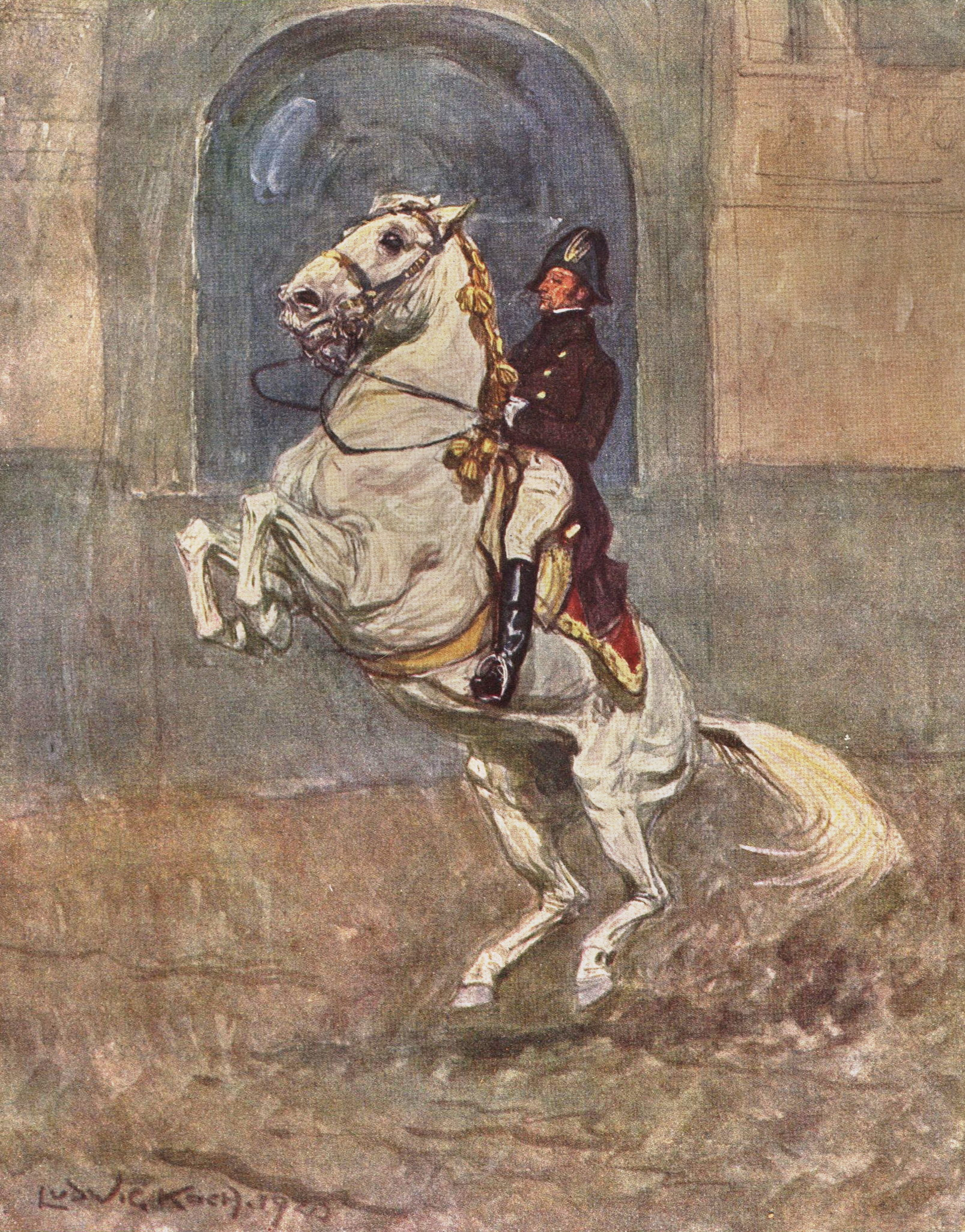
Courbette

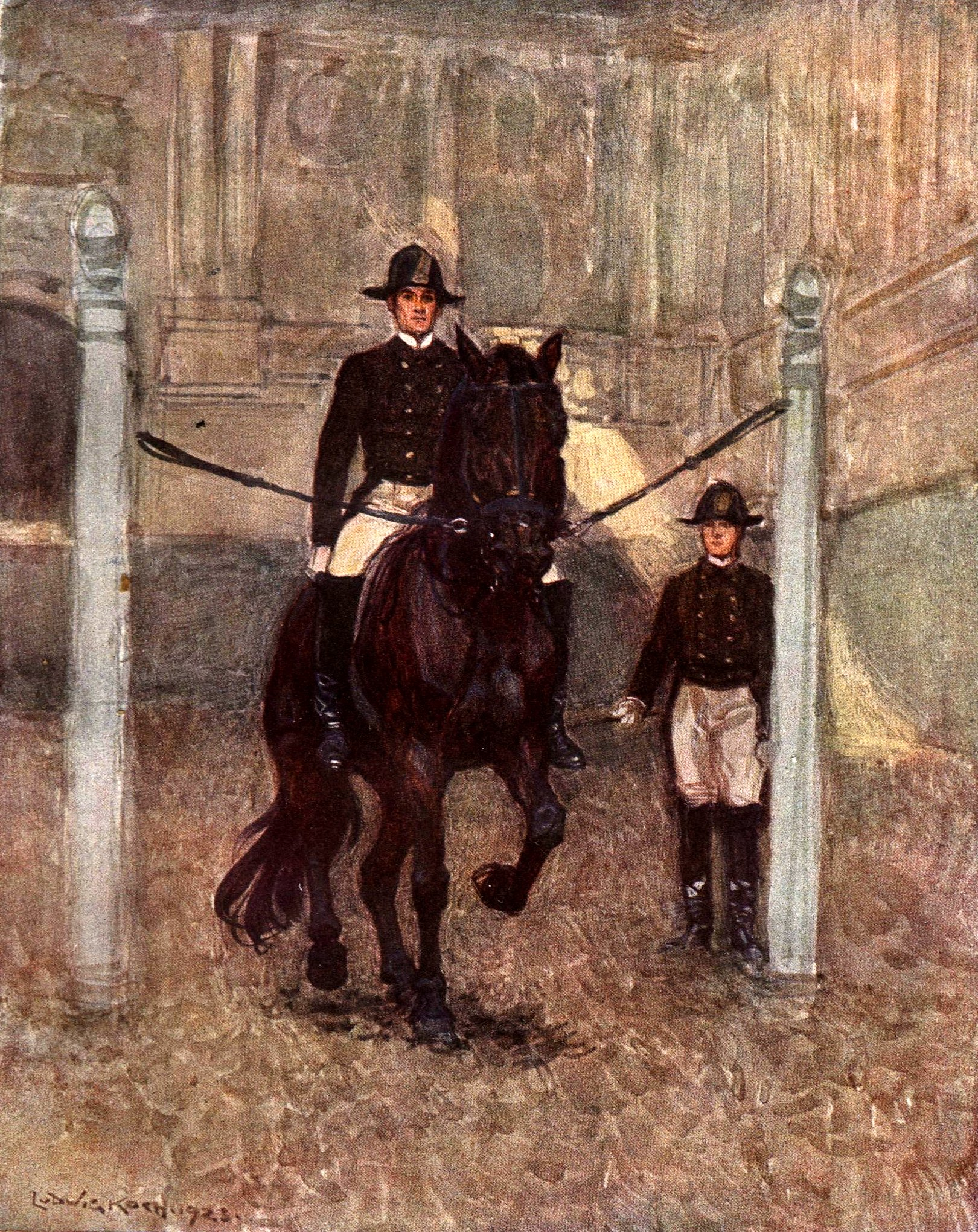
Piaffe in the Pillars

== Dress and equipment ==
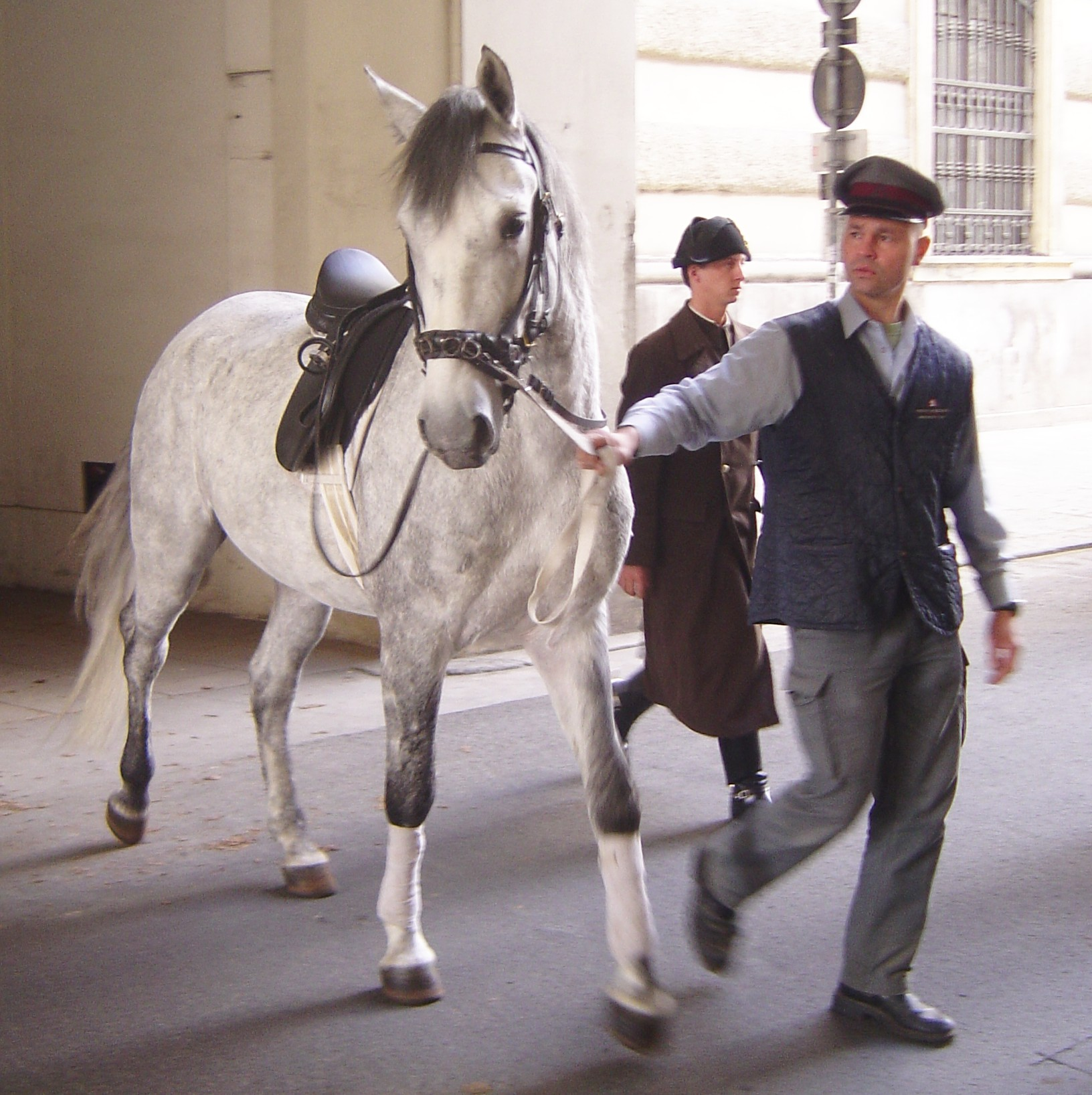
A young stallion on the way from training to the stable

All riders wear the traditional uniform: brown tailcoats, bicorne-style hats, white buckskin breeches, white suede gloves, and black top riding boots. Swan neck spurs are also part of the uniform. The empire style uniform (1795–1820 in fashion) has remained relatively unchanged for 200 years.

During performances, the fully trained stallions wear a traditional gold-plated breastplate and crupper, called a Goldzeug. They also carry a "school saddle", which is made from buckskin and larger than the more commonly seen English saddle used by the school when training the stallions and riders. Gold-plated double bridles are only used for performances. All horses, except the young stallions, wear red and gold or green and gold shabracks, or saddlecloths, under the saddle. Red is for "All Steps and Movements of the High School", "Pas de Deux", "On the Long Rein", "The Grand Solo" and "The School quadrille." Green is used for "Work In-Hand" and the "Airs above the Ground". The shabrack is also used to differentiate the status of each rider: the director of the school has three gold bands and gold fringe, the chief riders have three bands and no fringe, riders have two bands, and assistant riders have one.

The young stallions are not exhibited in the same equipment as the more mature animals. They are ridden in a plain snaffle bridle and a simple dressage-style English saddle. For training sessions, black bridles, both snaffle bit bridles and double bridles, are used for all horses.

Horses are clean and well groomed. The Capriole horses wear a braided tail wrapped short in a "queue" (known elsewhere as a "mud tail"), which is fixed with a decorative tail bag (Schweiftasche).

== Notable people ==
- Ernst Hoyos
- Ernst Lindenbauer
- Alois Podhajsky
- Gottlieb Polak
- Georg Wahl
- Maximilian Weyrother

== See also ==
- Cadre Noir
- Escola Portuguesa de Arte Equestre
- Piber Federal Stud
- Royal Andalusian School of Equestrian Art
