= Kladruber =

Horse breed

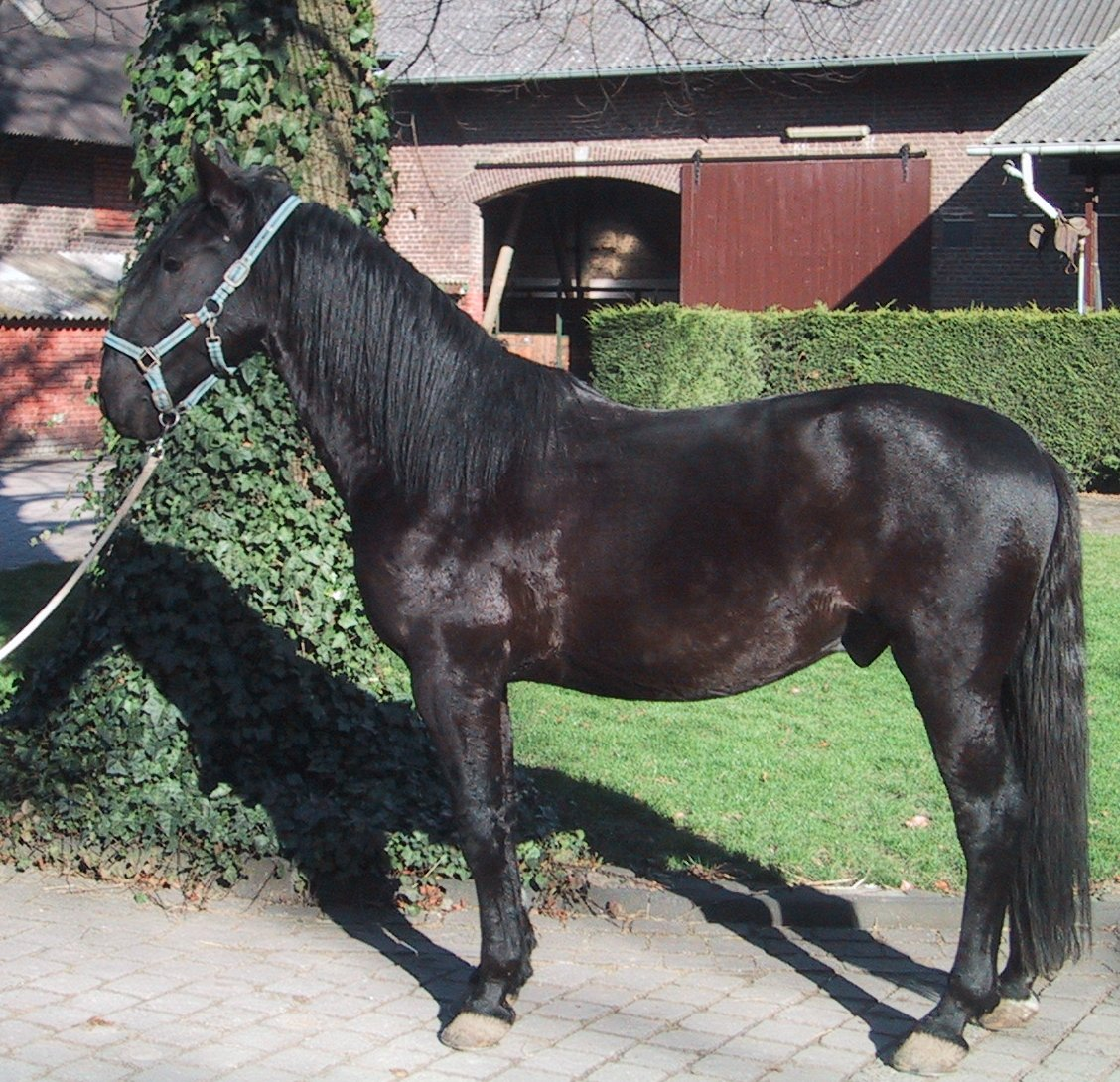
- Kladruber
- Other names: Oldkladruby horse
- Country of origin: Developed in the Habsburg Empire, now attributed primarily to the Czech Republic

Traits
- Weight: average 600 kg
- Height: 160 to 170 centimetres (15.3 to 16.3 hands; 63 to 67 in)
- Colour: black or gray
- Distinguishing features: coat color is black or gray only, no markings

Breed standards
- [ Czech Kladruber studbook]

The Kladruber (Czech Starokladrubský kůň) is the oldest Czech horse breed and one of the world's oldest horse breeds. It is considered very rare. The chief breeder and the keeper of the studbook is the National Stud at Kladruby nad Labem in the Czech Republic where Kladrubers have been bred for more than 400 years. Kladrubers have always been bred to be a galakarossier – a heavy type of carriage horse for the court of the House of Habsburg.

== Breed history ==
Bred in the stud at Kladruby nad Labem, the Kladruber breed is almost 400 years old, yet is remarkably rare – 492 mares in January 2011. Kladruby stud was founded in 1579 by Rudolf II as an Imperial stud, at the Pernstein stables. The breed was based on imported Spanish (such as the Andalusian) and Italian horses, crossed with Neapolitan, Danish, Holstein, Irish, and Oldenburg blood, in addition to the heavy Czech breeds. The animal was first developed to be a galakarosier; a heavy type of carriage horse used to pull the imperial coach, usually in a four- or six-in-hand, at ceremonies and funerals. It originally came in a variety of colors, including palomino and appaloosa, although today the breed is strictly gray or black, due to a breeding program requiring 18 "white" (i.e. fully mature grays) and 18 black stallions for various ceremonies of the court.

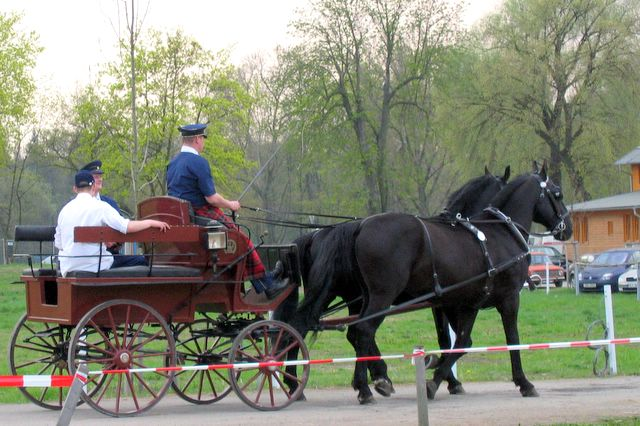
Black Kladruber stallions at Prague photo: Hanka Čertík

The stud was evacuated during the Seven Years' War to Kopčany, Slovakia and Enyed, Hungary. Due to a fire in 1757, the earliest 200 years of breeding records were lost, and the stud was dissolved before the remaining breeding stock was brought back to a new stud in Kladruby. The surviving records show a particular influence by several stallions on the herd of gray Kladrubers:

- Pepoli: a gray who sired the colt Generale in Kopcany in 1787. Generale is thought to be the progenitor of all gray Kladrubers today, and he produced the son Generalissimus (1797) who produced a separate lineage.
- Maestoso (1773) and Favory (1779): born in Kladruby, became two of the six founding Lipizzan stallion lineages. Favory returned to Kladruby after World War II, to add new blood to the decimated herd.
- Barzoi and Legion: Orlov Trotters added new blood between World War I and World War II.
- Rudolfo: A Lusitano from Portugal, added new blood after World War II.

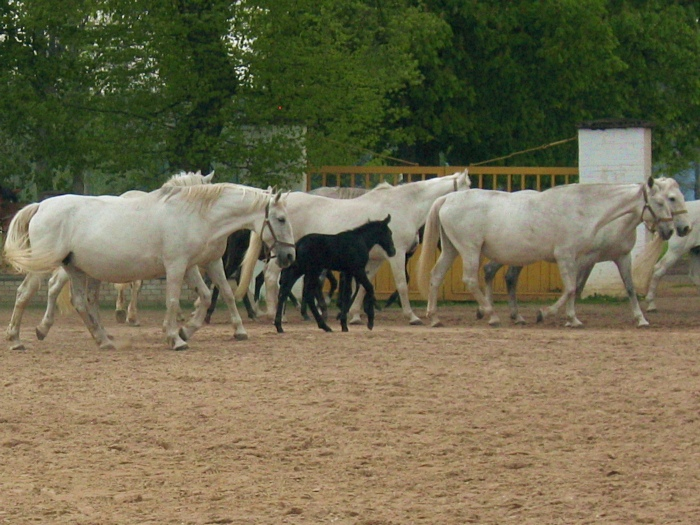
Members of the "white" (actually grey) herd

The herd of black Kladrubers had two particular influential stallions, Sacramoso (born 1799) and Napoleone (born 1845), and was regenerated in Slatinany. The black and grey Kladrubers have several differences due to their breeding. The grey is finer, more Thoroughbredish in type, and usually taller than the black. The black has more Neapolitan blood, and thus is heavier, has a shorter croup, a different head and neck, and a more "Nordic" look to it.

Pepoli's bloodlines are still bred at the Kladruby Stud, but the herd of black horses sired by Sacromoso and Napoleone was destroyed in the 1930s, after many of the animals were sold for meat. Despite the decimated herd, a few horses were saved and efforts have been made by breeders to re-establish their bloodlines at a new stud in Slatinany, at The Research Institute for Horse Breeding.

In 2019, the Imperial Stud Farm and the surrounding landscape was added to the UNESCO World Heritage List, as an exceptional example of equestrian cultural development.

=== Timeline of Imperial stud farm Kladruby nad Labem ===
- 1491 Pernstein family purchased the Pardubice estate, later including the Kladruby game park
- 1560 Maxmilian II (emperor since 1563) given the Pardubice estate with Kladruby game park as a gift from the Czech estates
- 1562 Maximilian II allegedly founded a Spanish horse stud farm in Kladruby, though no evidence of this survives.
- 1579 Emperor Rudolf II gave the stud farm an Imperial Court Stud Farm status
- 1757 Stud farm (with studbook documents) burned down
- 1770 Emperor Joseph II rebuilt the stud farm
- 1764 foaling date of Pepoli, founding stallion of the grey variety of Kladrubers
- 1787 foaling date of Generale, grey stallion
- 1797 foaling date of Generalissimus, grey stallion
- 1800 foaling date of Sacramoso, black stallion
- 1844 new Empire (style) stables built
- 1918 stud farm falls under governance and management by the new nation of Czechoslovakia
- 1922 Napoleone bloodline extinct
- 1994 Kladrubers are made the household breed at the Royal Court of Denmark, serving on ceremonial occasions
- 1995 Kladruber breed was designated Czech Cultural Heritage
- 2002 Kladruby stud farm and the core herd of grey Kladrubers was designated Czech National Cultural Heritage
- 2005 Kladrubers serve on ceremonial occasions at the Royal Court of Sweden and are used by mounted police of Sweden as well

== Breed characteristics ==
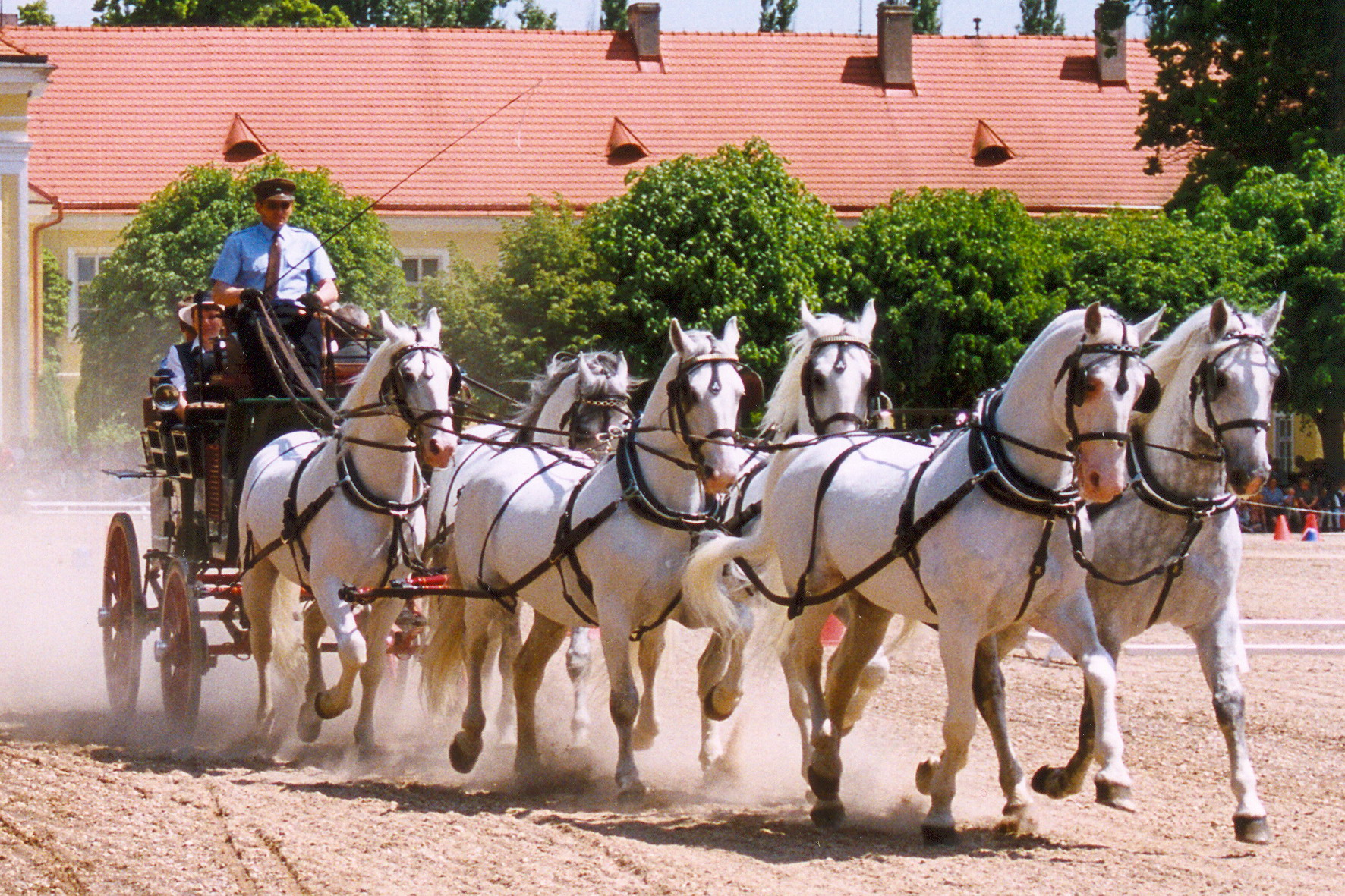
Kladrubers in harness

Modern Kladrubers are usually grey. Many stand between 16.2 and 17 hands high 66 to 68 inches (170 to 170 cm) and are primarily used in harness. They are suitable for light draft and agriculture, and can be seen at the international levels in the sport of combined driving. This FEI sport makes good use of the Kladruber's calm nature, endurance, and relative speed. The Kladruber is also occasionally crossbred with lighter breeds to produce a more suitable riding horse, usually for dressage.

Due to their small gene pool and long history of selective breeding, Kladruber type is well "set" and they possess recognizable breed characteristics. Many of these characteristics, such as a prominent Roman or convex facial profile, have been retained from their ancestors. While the relatively upright shoulder, pasterns and hooves, long back, and short croup are not desirable in a riding horse, these qualities allow high-stepping gaits in a driving horse. The high-set, powerful and well-arched neck of the Kladruber was a trademark feature of their Spanish-Neapolitan ancestors, and contributes to their appearance in harness. A horse of substance, the Kladruber possesses a deep, broad chest and sound legs with large joints and hooves. Their legs are unfeathered, though the mane and tail are thick and flowing, and the features are lean rather than fleshy. All gaits, though most especially the trot, should have high action and elasticity with a clear cadence.
