= Josefsplatz =

Public square at the Hofburg Palace in Vienna, Austria

Coordinates: 48.206443°N 16.36722°E

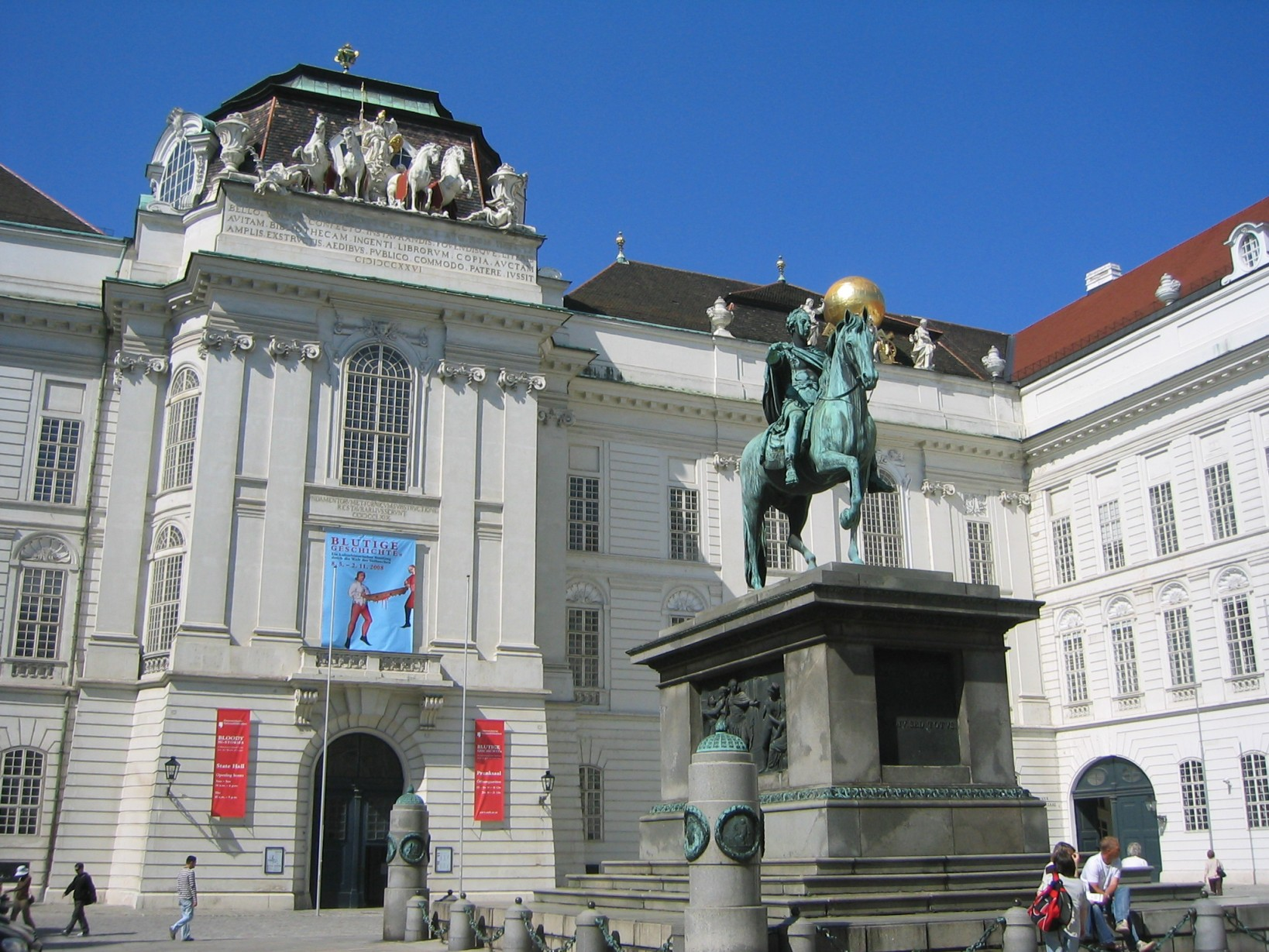
Josefsplatz at the Hofburg Palace in Vienna, Austria

Josefsplatz (English: Joseph's Square) is a public square located at the Hofburg Palace in Vienna, Austria. Named after Emperor Joseph II, Josefsplatz is considered one of the finest courtyards in Vienna.

== Description ==
Josefsplatz is centred on a full-sized equestrian statue and monument of Emperor Joseph II, erected by sculptor Franz Anton von Zauner between 1795 and 1807. Modelled on the statue of Marcus Aurelius on Capitoline Hill in Rome, the statue was commissioned by Emperor Francis II who, from the age of 16, had been raised under the supervision of his uncle, Joseph II. The depiction of Joseph II as a Roman conqueror, dressed in a toga and a laurel wreath, reflects the Habsburg belief that they were descendants of the ancient Roman emperors.

The square is enclosed on three sides by sections of the Hofburg Palace. Facing Augustinerstrasse is the Prunksaal (State Hall), the central structure of the Austrian National Library, which is part of the Hofburg Palace complex—a fine example of late baroque architecture on a grand scale. The building was designed by Johann Bernhard Fischer von Erlach and his son Joseph Emanuel Fischer von Erlach, with side wings later added to the designs by Nikolaus Pacassi. In addition to its function as a library, the building was also designed as a concert hall with superb acoustics. The library museum suffered catastrophic damage in the 1848 battle for Vienna, with the zoological collection being completely destroyed by cannon fire.

To the left of the Prunksaal (facing southeast) is the Augustinian wing of the Austrian National Library and the Augustinian Church, the oldest building on the square. To the right of the Prunksaal and facing the Augustinian Church are the Redoutensäle (Redoute Halls), which were added to the Hofburg complex between 1744 and 1748. The wing was badly damaged by fire in 1992.

In the northwest corner of the square is the Stallburg (Stable Palace), the former Imperial Stables, which once housed around nine hundred Lipizzaner horses. Built in the sixteenth century for Archduke Maximillian, the Stallburg housed the art collection of Archduke Leopold Wilhelm between 1614 and 1662. The building was later converted to stables for the Hofburg, surrounding a large courtyard with arcades on three levels with large chimneys. Today the Stallburg houses the Spanish Riding School and the Lipizzaner Museum.

Across from the square are two palaces. The Pallavicini Palace at number 5, completed in 1784, is a blend of baroque and neo-classical styles by Ferdinand von Hohenberg. The Palffy Palace was built in the sixteenth century.

Josefsplatz was featured as a notable location in the film The Third Man (1949).

== Commemorative coin ==
Josefsplatz was selected as the motif of an Austrian euro collectors' coin: the 5 euro Austrian 2006 EU Presidency commemorative coin, minted on 18 January 2006. The reverse shows the Hofburg Palace in the square. The equestrian statue of Emperor Joseph II is in its center. The wing of the Hofburg can be seen to the right, which contains the Spanish Riding School and the Redoutensäle.

== Gallery ==
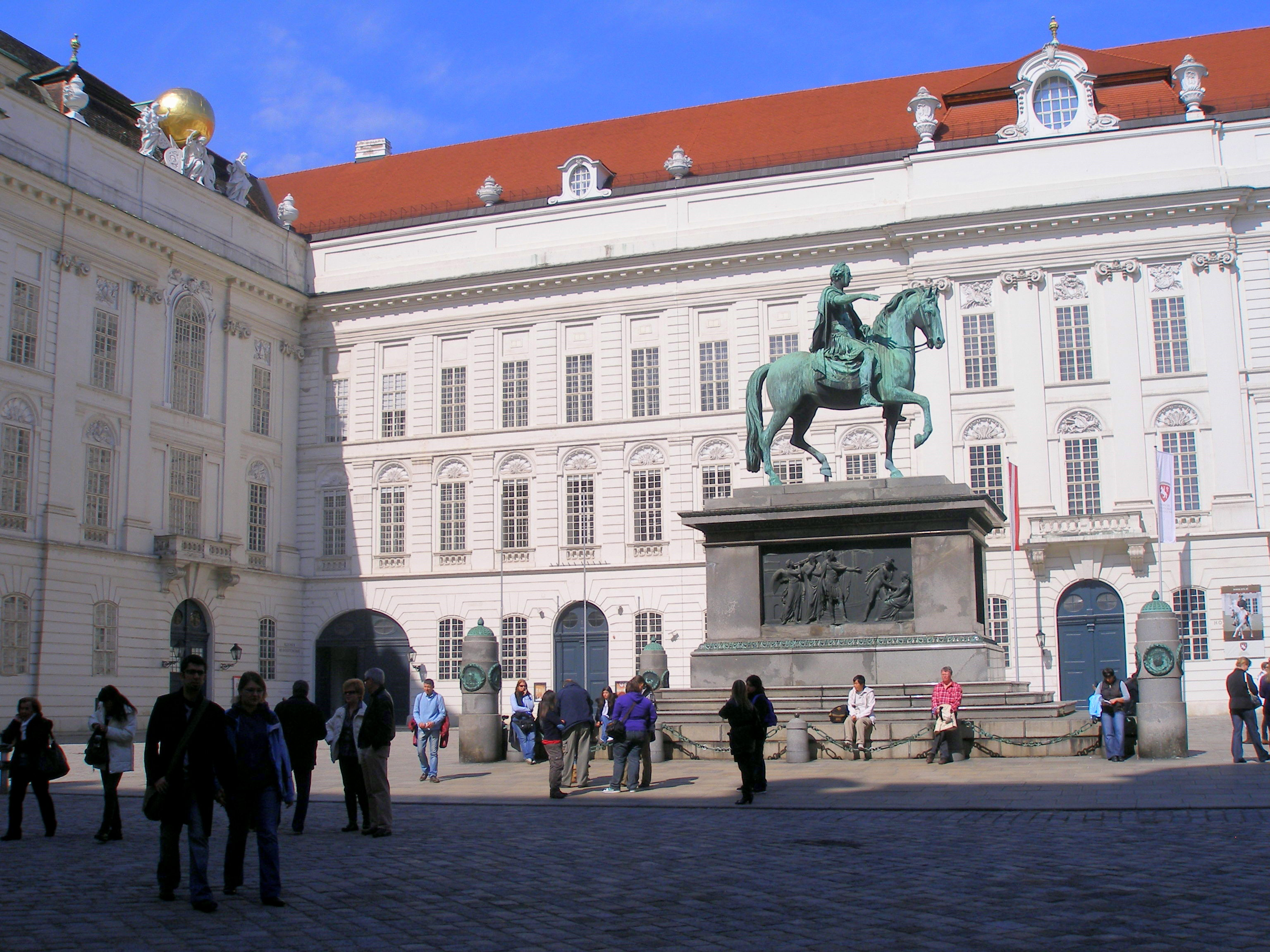
Josefsplatz

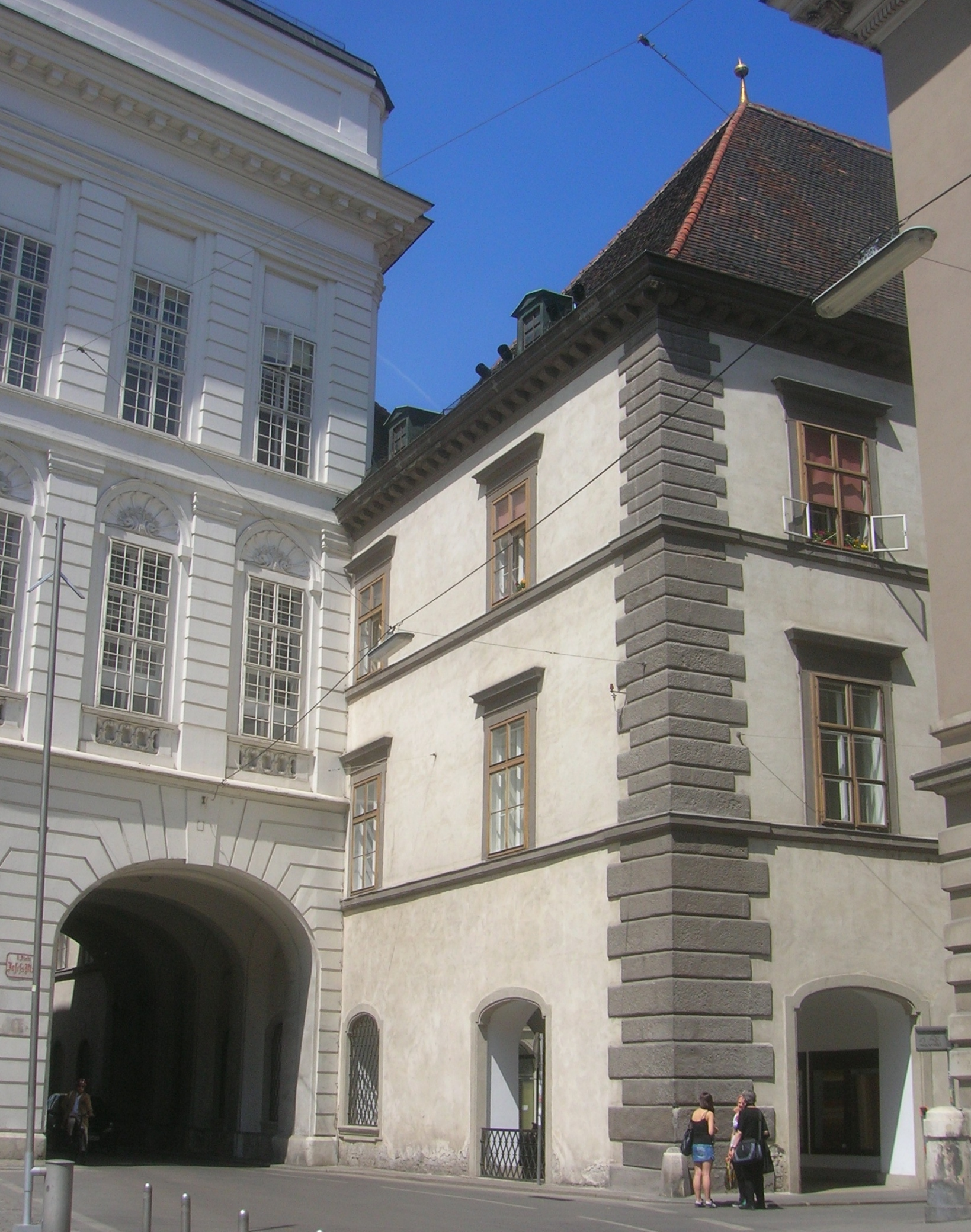
Stallburg, from Josefsplatz

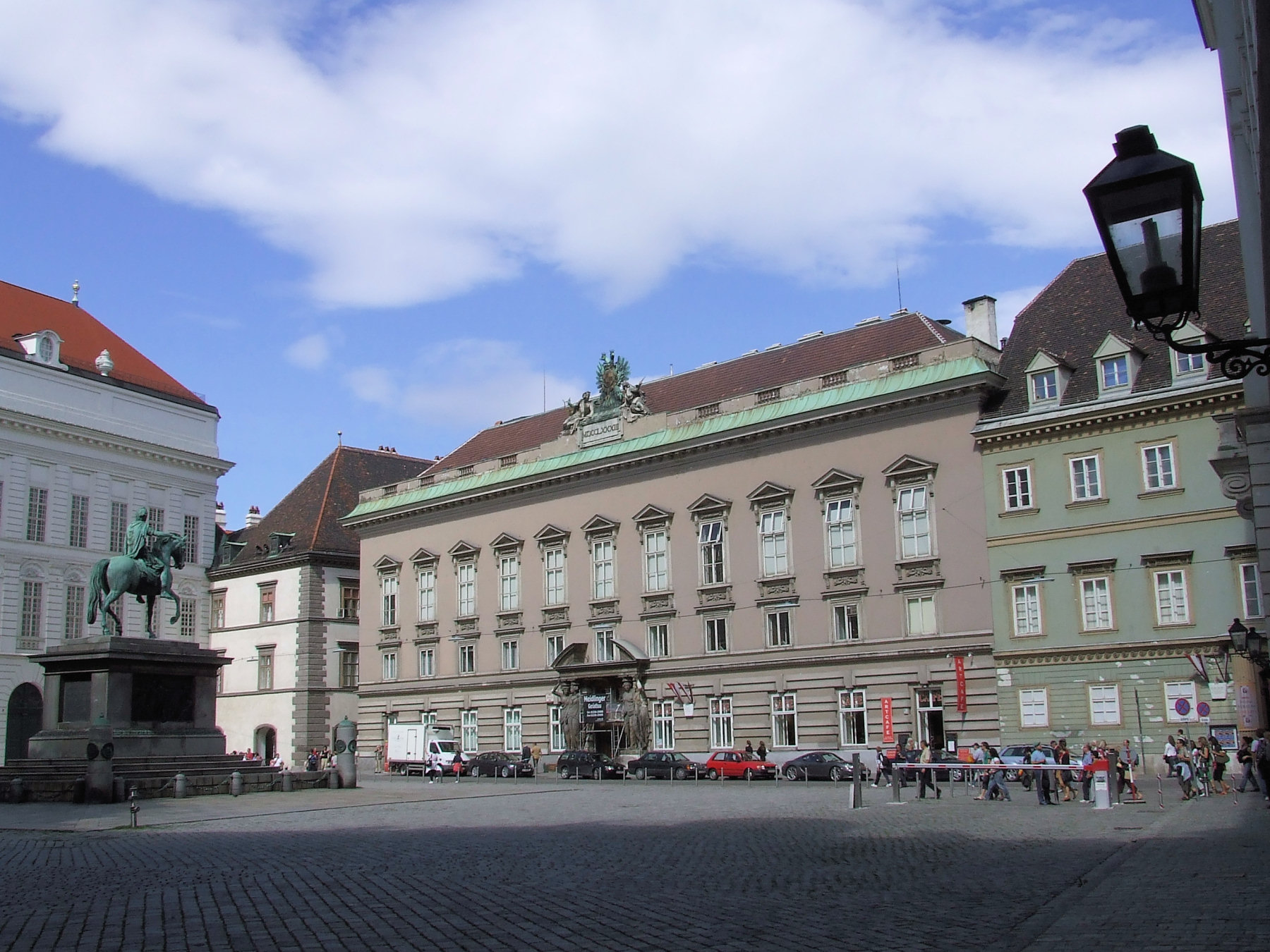
Josefsplatz

Austrian 2006 EU commemorative coin
