= Kladruby nad Labem =

- Municipality
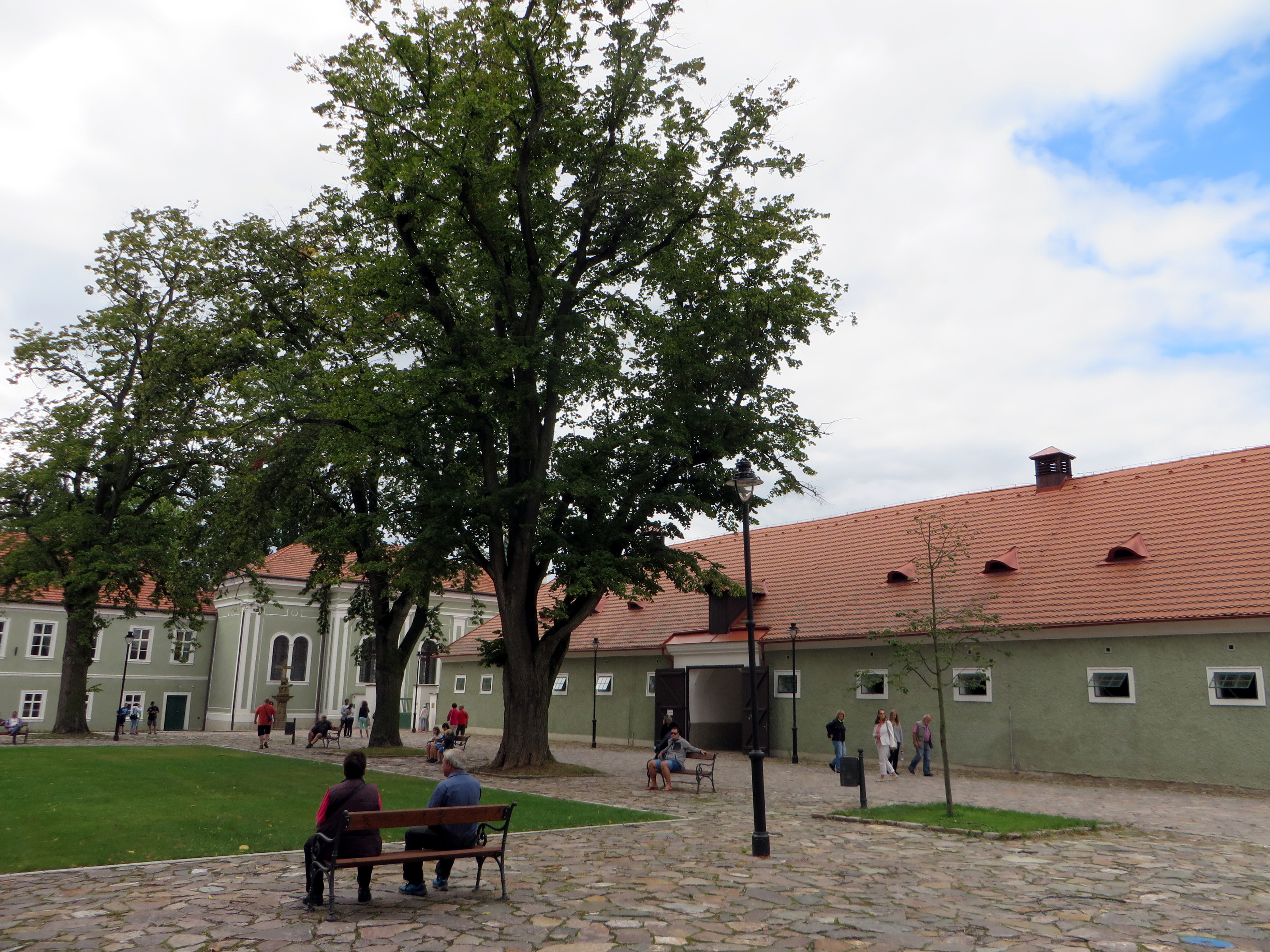
- National Stud Farm

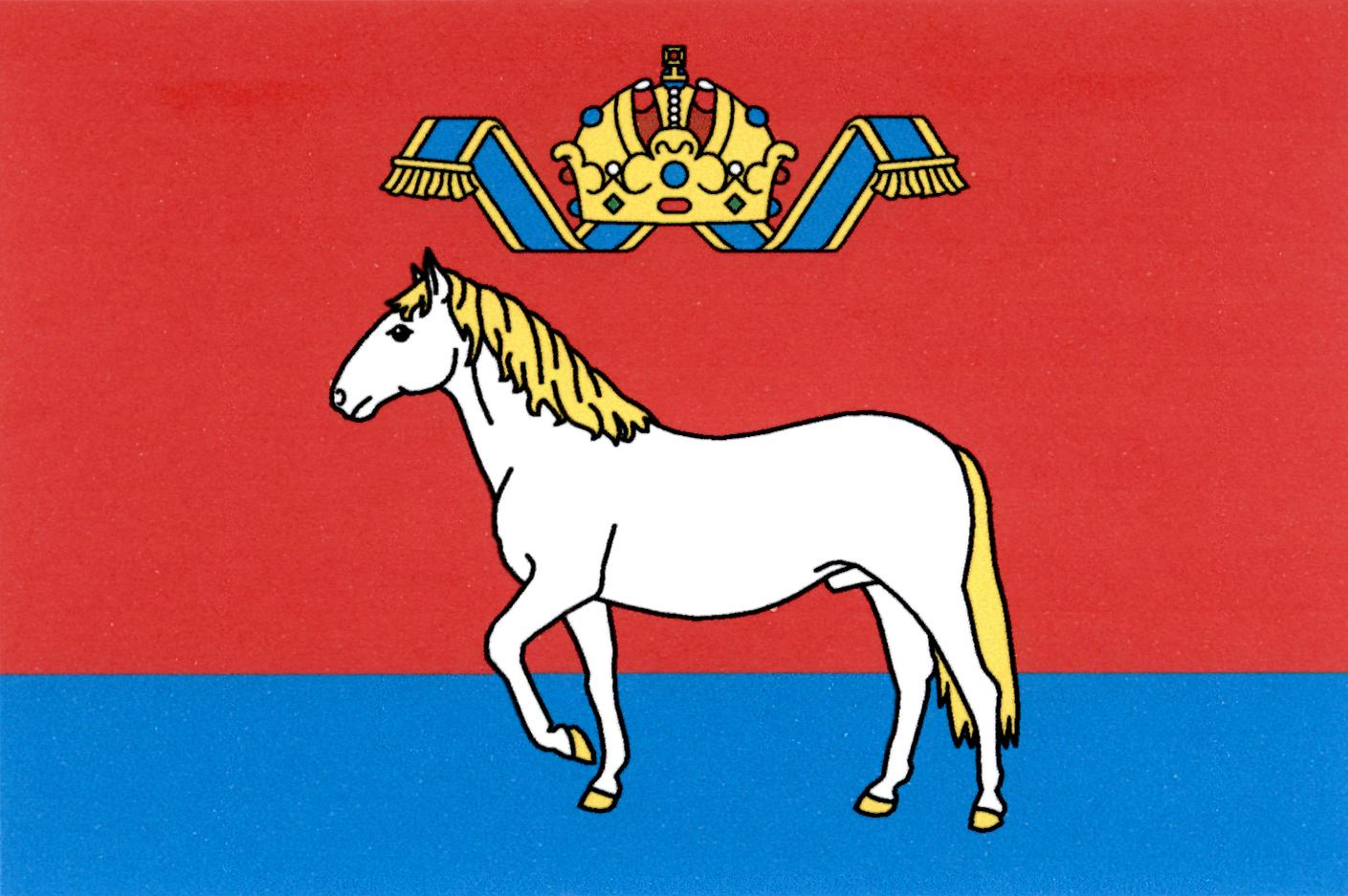
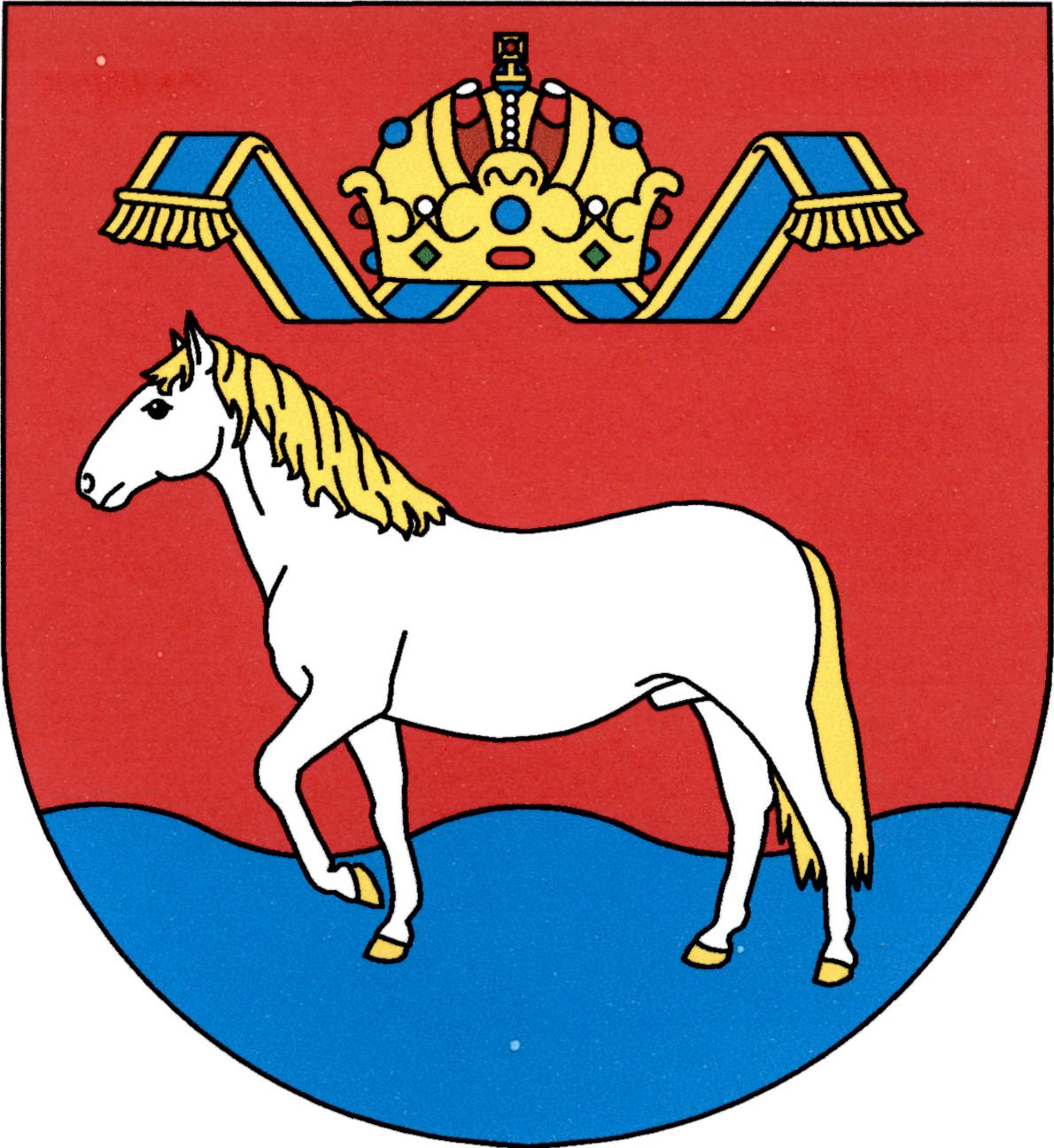
- Flag Coat of arms

- Location in the Czech Republic
- Coordinates: 50°3′28″N 15°29′14″E
- Country: Czech Republic
- Region: Pardubice
- District: Pardubice
- First mentioned: 1295

Area
  - Total: 23.81 km^{2} (9.19 sq mi)
- Elevation: 206 m (676 ft)

Population (2026-01-01)
  - Total: 651
  - Density: 27.3/km^{2} (70.8/sq mi)
- Time zone: UTC+1 (CET)
  - Summer (DST): UTC+2 (CEST)
- Postal codes: 533 14, 533 16, 535 01
- Website: www.kladrubynadlabem.cz

UNESCO World Heritage Site
- Official name: Landscape for Breeding and Training of Ceremonial Carriage Horses at Kladruby nad Labem
- Criteria: Cultural: (iv), (v)
- Reference: 1589
- Inscription: 2019 (43rd Session)
- Area: 1,310 ha (5.1 sq mi)
- Buffer zone: 3,248 ha (12.54 sq mi)

Kladruby nad Labem (Czech pronunciation: [ˈkladrubɪ ˈnad labɛm]) is a municipality and village in Pardubice District in the Pardubice Region of the Czech Republic. It has about 700 inhabitants. The municipality is located on the Elbe River in the East Elbe Table.

Kladruby nad Labem is known as the home of the Kladruber horse breed. The village with the surrounding landscape is a UNESCO World Heritage Site.

== Administrative division ==
Kladruby nad Labem consists of four municipal parts (in brackets population according to the 2021 census):

- Kladruby nad Labem (337)
- Bílé Vchynice (117)
- Kolesa (108)
- Komárov (59)

== Etymology ==
The name Kladruby is a common Czech name of settlements, derived from kláda (i.e. 'log') and rubat (i.e. 'to chop'). This name was used for settlements where lumberjacks lived.

== Geography ==
Kladruby nad Labem is located about 20 kilometres (12 mi) west of Pardubice. It lies in a flat landscape in the East Elbe Table, in the Polabí region. The Elbe River forms the southern municipal border. The stream Strašovský potok flows through the municipality.

== History ==
The first written mention of Kladruby nad Labem is from 1295, when it was a property of the Premonstratensian monastery at Litomyšl. During the second half of the 14th century, it came into the possession of the Cistercian Sedlec Abbey near Kutná Hora. In 1500, the village was acquired by Vilém II of Pernštejn, who already owned large parts of the Pardubice region. Kladruby remained in possession of the Pernštejn family until 1560, when it was purchased by Emperor Ferdinand I from his master of the horse, Jaroslav of Pernštejn.

In 1579, Emperor Rudolf II established the Imperial Stud at Kladruby, from which Spanish-blood horses were bred for ceremonial purposes.

Following the fall of Austria-Hungary in 1918, the stud farm at Kladruby came under state administration.

== Demographics ==
Historical population

Year	Pop.	±%
1869	933	—
1880	983	+5.4%
1890	949	−3.5%
1900	997	+5.1%
1910	1,122	+12.5%

Year	Pop.	±%
1921	1,105	−1.5%
1930	999	−9.6%
1950	817	−18.2%
1961	816	−0.1%
1970	764	−6.4%

Year	Pop.	±%
1980	807	+5.6%
1991	777	−3.7%
2001	660	−15.1%
2011	644	−2.4%
2021	621	−3.6%

Source: Censuses

== Transport ==
There are no railways on major roads running through the municipality.

== Sights ==
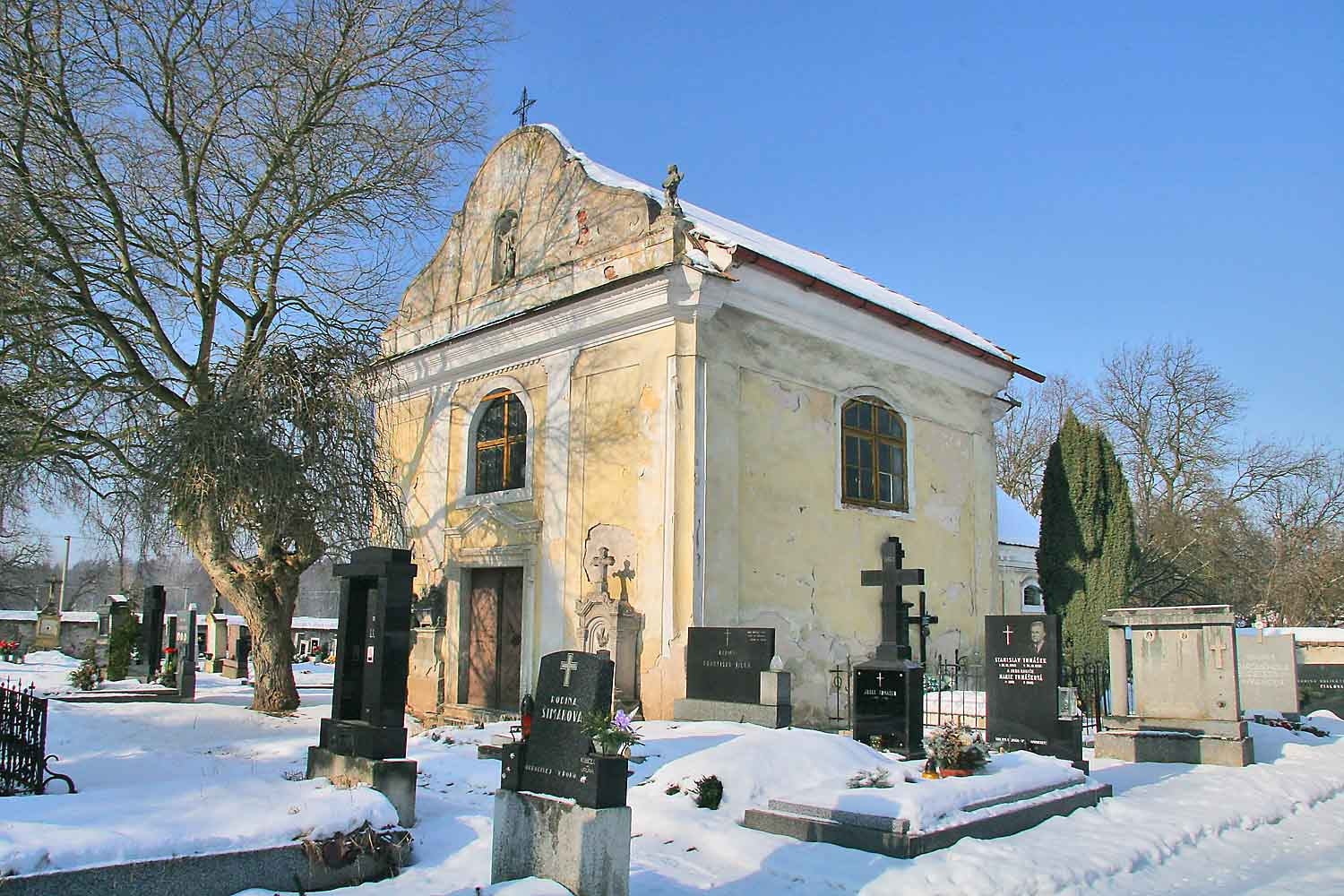
Church of the Holy Cross

In 2019, the Landscape for Breeding and Training of Ceremonial Carriage Horses at Kladruby nad Labem was inscribed as a UNESCO World Heritage Site. The site includes the villages of Kladruby nad Labem and Selmice, the Imperial Stud Farm, and the surrounding farmsteads, gardens, pastures, and watercourses. The landscape was uniquely designed in the 16th and 17th centuries to effectively breed and train the Kladruber horses. In addition, the area demonstrates an outstanding example of the ferme ornée style of landscape architecture made popular in the 18th century.

== Notable people ==
- Gottlieb Polak (1883–1942), horse rider
- Zdeněk Matějček (1922–2004), child psychologist and researcher
