= Ernst Hoyos =

Austrian equestrian (b. 1955)

Ernst Hoyos (born 1955) is an Austrian dressage trainer, who trained and worked from 1973 to 2002 in the Spanish Riding School, Vienna. He trained Ulla Salzgeber, winner of Olympic individual silver and bronze and two team medals, and Lisa Wilcox of the Equestrian Team bronze medal squad.
