= Heldenberg Memorial =

Open-air pantheon in Heldenberg, Lower Austria

Coordinates: 48°29′40″N 15°56′30″E

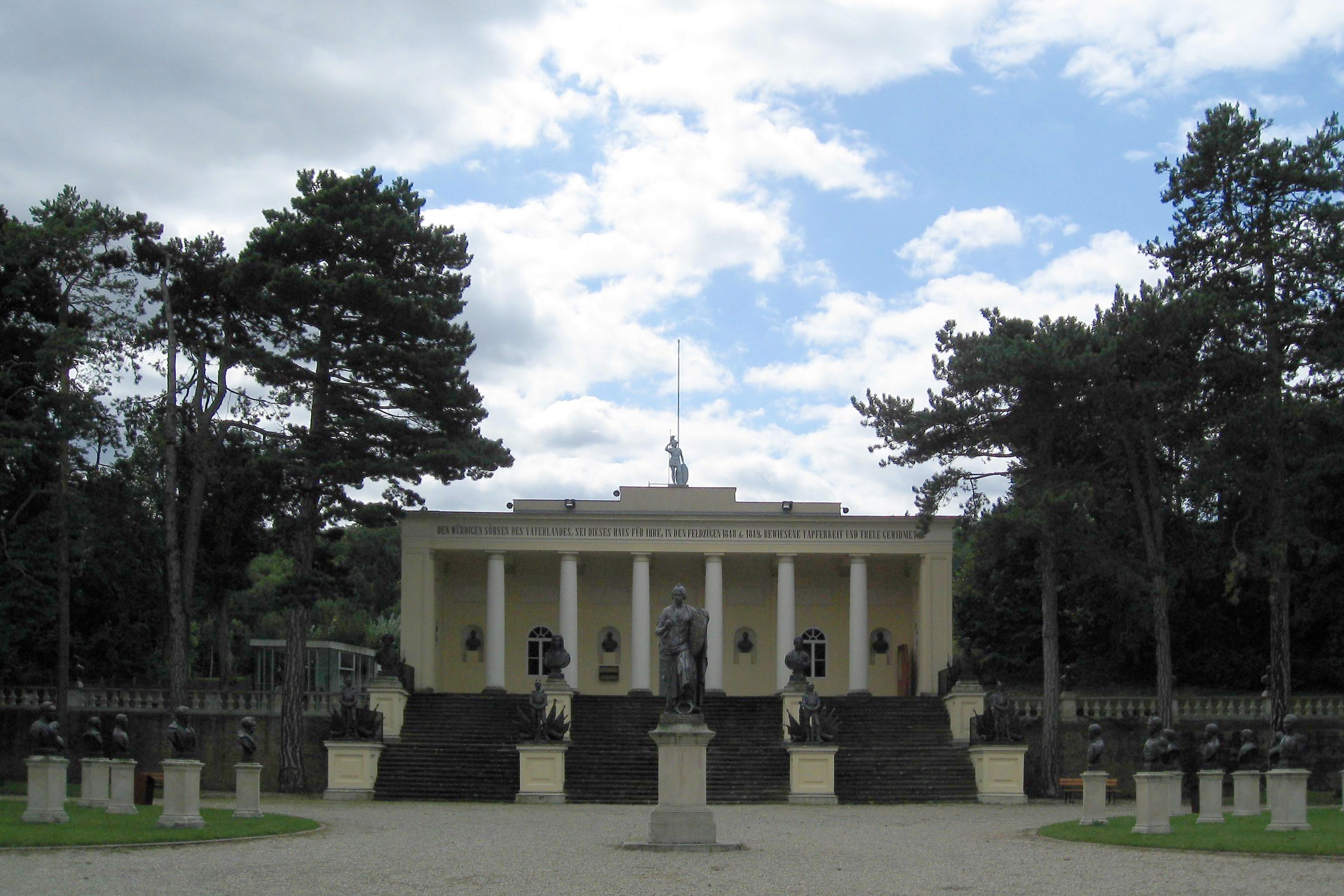
Heldenberg Memorial

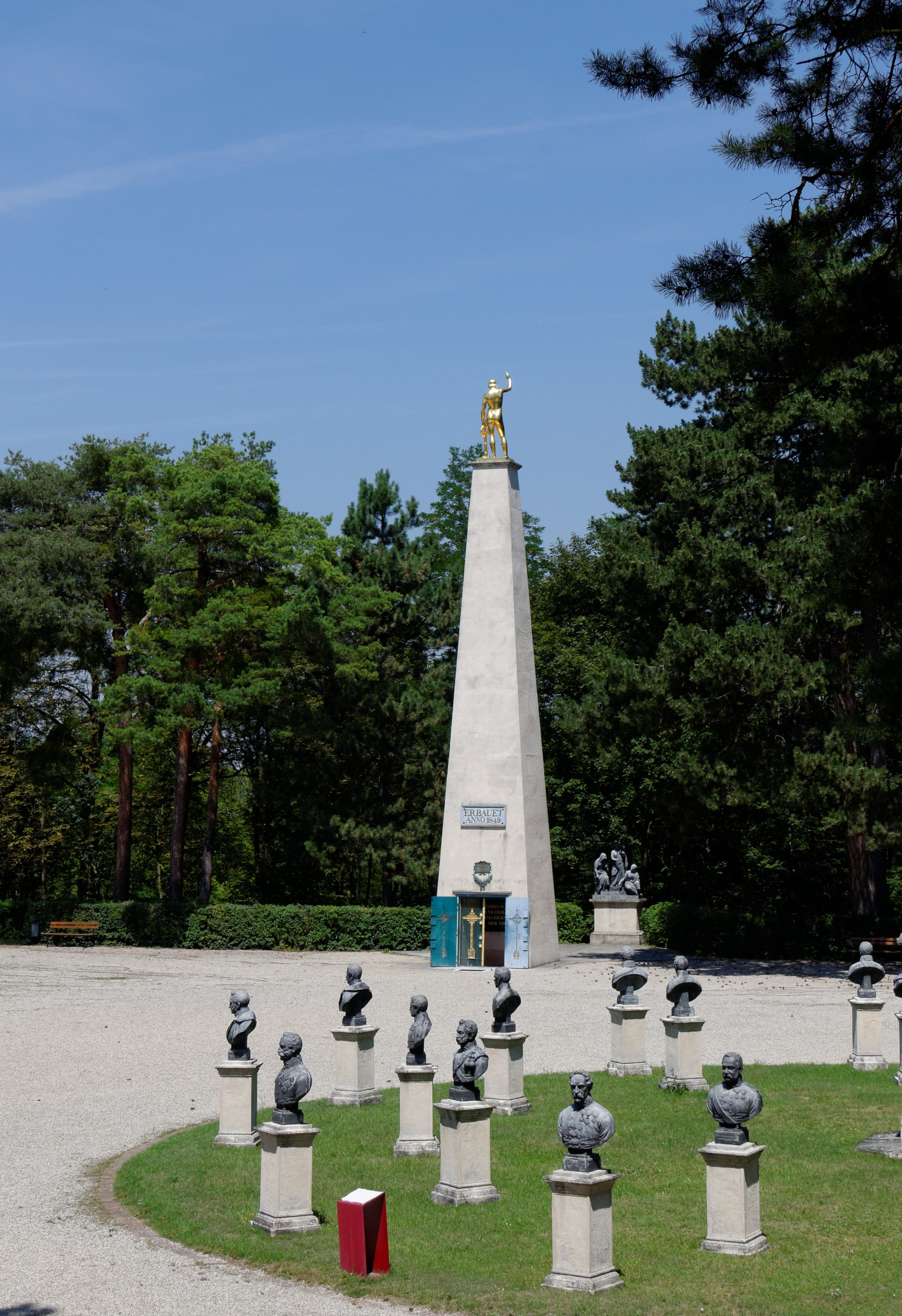
The obelisk and entrance to the crypt

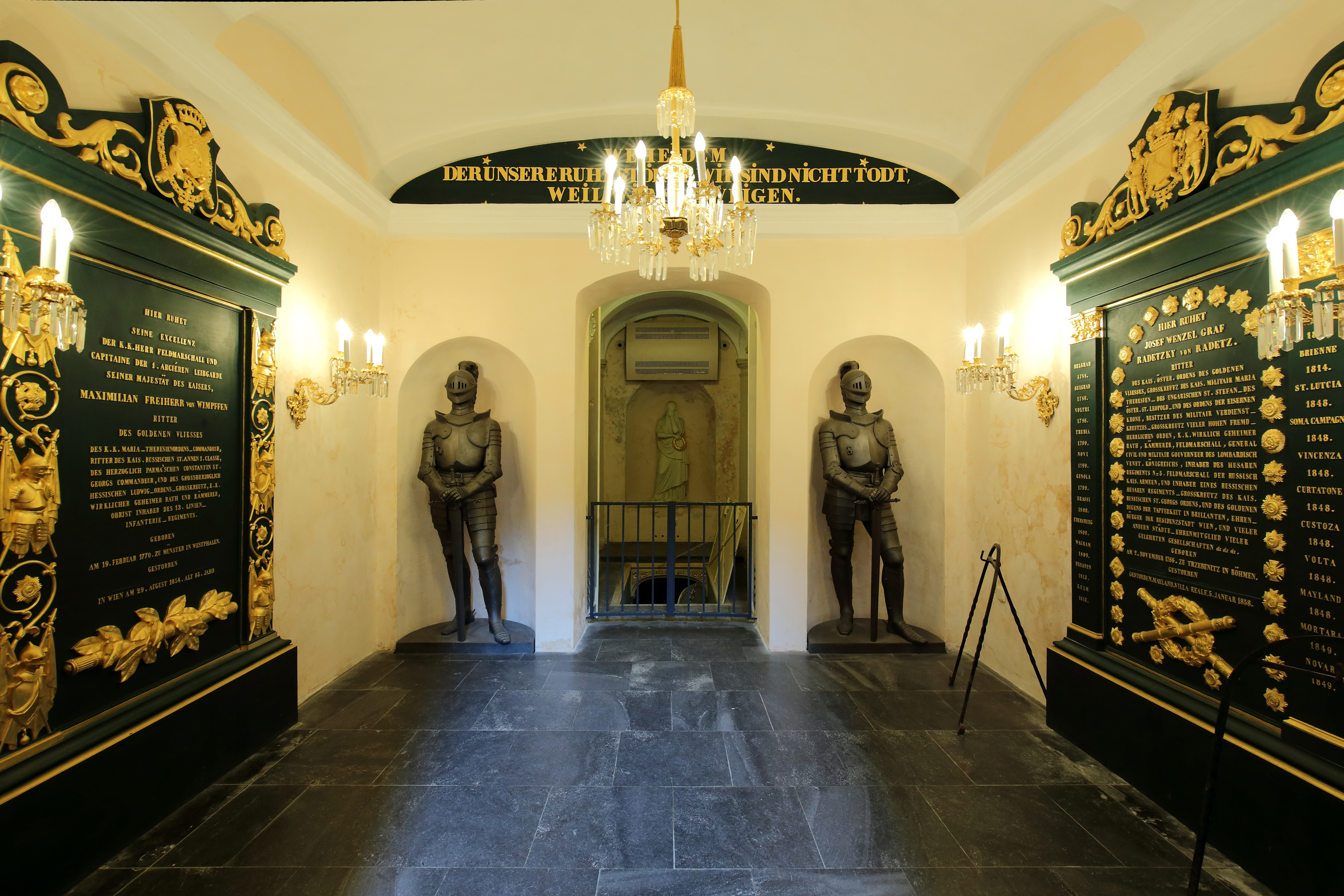
Crypt of Radetzky, Wimpffen and Pargfrieder

The Heldenberg Memorial is an open-air pantheon in the grounds of the castle at Kleinwetzdorf, Heldenberg, Lower Austria. It houses busts and statues of Austrian rulers and military personnel and was set up in 1849 by Joseph Gottfried Pargfrieder, a major supplier to the imperial army, who claimed to be an illegitimate son of Emperor Joseph II.

Joseph Radetzky von Radetz, an Austrian Army Field Marshal and national hero, died on January 5, 1858, after an accident in Milan. The Emperor wished that he be buried in the Capuchin crypt (the Imperial Crypt in Vienna), however, Radetzky had bequeathed his earthly remains, and the right to bury him, to Pargfrieder, who had settled his debts earlier. On 19 January 1858, Radetzky was buried at the Heldenberg memorial. He lies in a crypt under a monumental obelisk, together with Field Marshal Maximilian von Wimpffen and Pargfrieder.

The site includes quarters for military invalids (an officer and twelve soldiers) who were intended to serve as guards of honour, however, these plans were never realized.

The site was renovated and expanded through the addition of a visitor centre for the 2005 Lower Austrian state exhibition ("Landesausstellung").

== See also ==
- Walhalla (Hall of the Slain, Regensburg, Germany)
- Befreiungshalle (Hall of Liberation, Kelheim, Germany)
- Ruhmeshalle (Hall of Fame, Munich, Germany)
