= Gottlieb Polak =

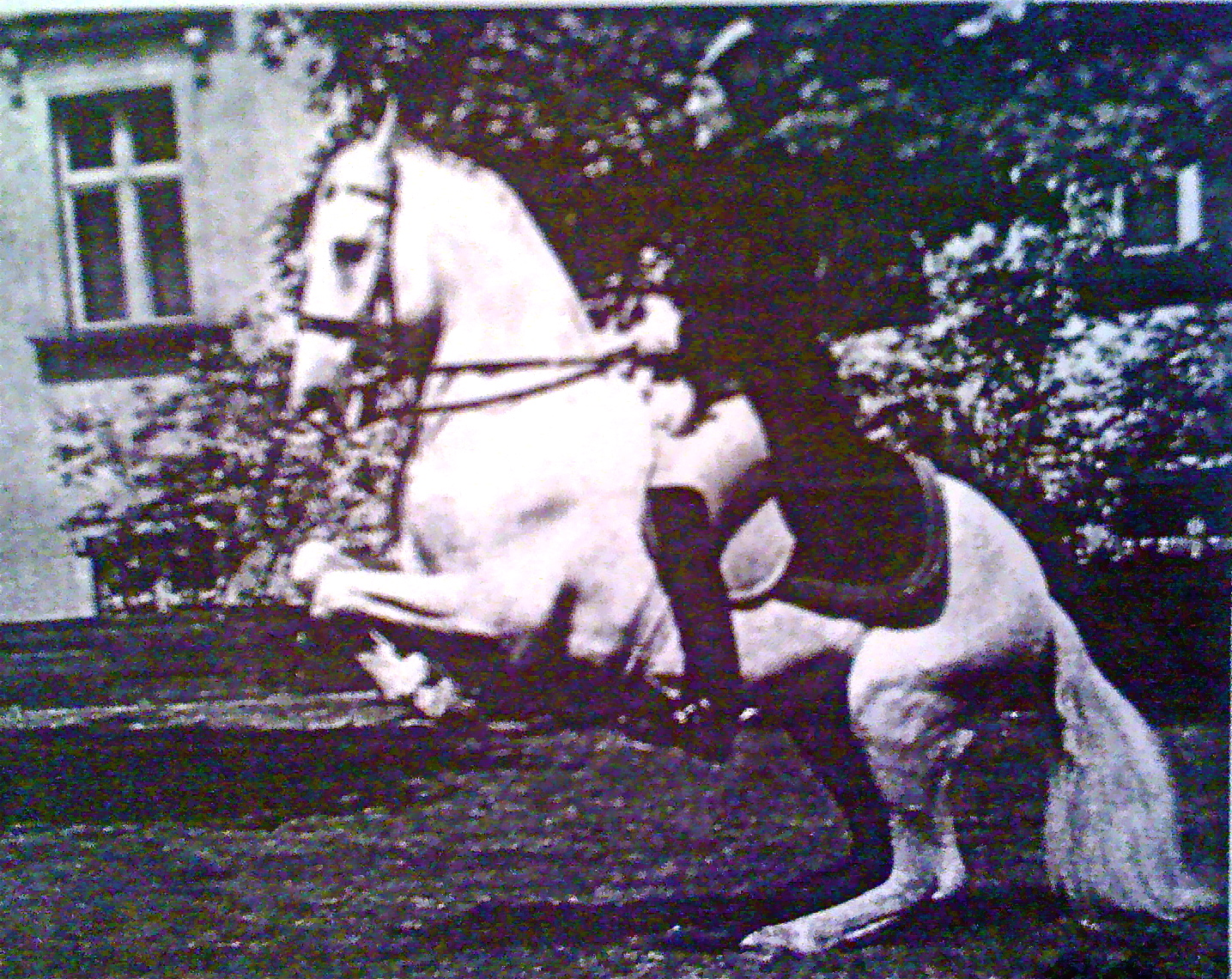
First Chief Rider Gottlieb Polak on Conversano Stornella, performing in the Levade

Gottlieb Polak (13 January 1883 in Kladruby nad Labem – 5 July 1942 in Vienna) was Chief Rider and Riding Master of the Spanish Riding School in Vienna during the 1930s, serving until his death in 1942.

Polak was a multiskilled individual who played the violin as well as being an talented rider, which was described as 'having a gift for working with horses'.

Polak was born in Kladruby nad Labem. He was the son of an employee (Hofgestütsbeamter) of the Kladrub Court stud, and developed a great fondness for horses from an early age. When he was a young man, his love for horses was so great that he dropped out of the Music Academy in Prague after a year and in 1900 became a pupil at the Kladruber Stables. In 1902, he entered the Imperial "Marstall" in Vienna. After military service with the 11th Lancers in Pardubice from 1904 to 1907, he was transferred, in 1908, to the Campaign Riding School (Hofstallungen) in Vienna, where he served Archduke Franz Ferdinand of Austria as one of his many duties.

In his twenties, Polak showed extraordinary riding talent. In 1917, he was admitted to the Spanish Riding School as a student (Reitskolar). In 1920 he was promoted to the rank of Rider (Bereiter), then in 1927 to Chief Rider (Oberbereiter) and in 1941, replacing Wenzel Zrust, to First Chief Rider (Erster Oberbereiter). His work was further recognized by the school with his promotion to Riding Master (Reitmeister). He was the first person to serve in this newly created position.

Polak's outstanding dressage skills were honored with the award of the German Riding Badge in Gold and the Swedish Order of Vasa. His most famous student was Alois Podhajsky, who later became Director of the school. Podhajsky trained at the Riding School before he participated in Dressage at the 1936 Olympic Games in Berlin.

On 10 May 1942 Polak was beginning a public performance on his young stallion Pluto Theodorosta, but fell from the horse, unconscious, after only a few strides, possibly due to a heart attack. He died a month later, on 5 July.
