= Hannah Zeitlhofer =

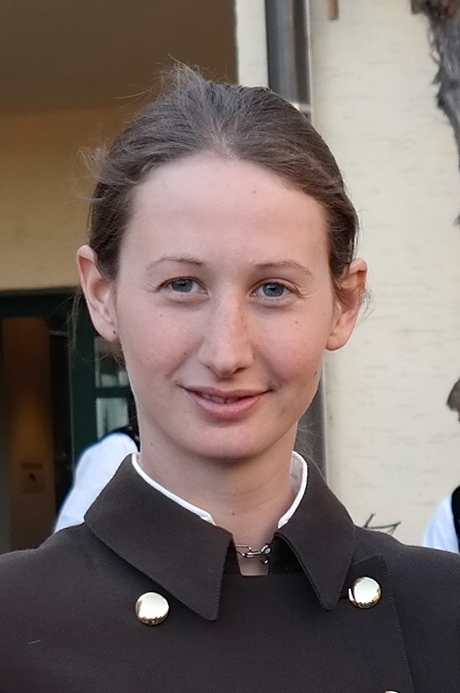
- Hannah Zeitlhofer
- Born: 1986 or 1987 (age 39–40)
- Occupation: Equestrian
- Known for: First woman rider at the Spanish Riding School

Hannah Zeitlhofer (born 1986 or 1987) is the first woman to reach the rank of Reiter (Rider) at the Spanish Riding School (SRS) of Vienna, Austria. She was inducted in 2016.

Zeithofer began to ride as a child and was given her first horse when she was nine years old. She studied Equestrian Science at the university level, and competed in dressage with a Haflinger named Joker. She was granted admission to the SRS in 2008 at the age of 21 and was one of the first two female élèves, beginning or apprentice riders, ever admitted to the school. Although Zeitlhofer did not express a view that she faced discrimination at the school, the school's chief rider noted that the young women had to win over a few malcontents. Her admission to the SRS occurred about one year after the school hired its first woman director, Elisabeth Gürtler. There had never been a rule against admission of women, but in practice and by tradition, it had never previously occurred. The overall program takes eight to twelve years to complete. She became the first "Assistant Rider" in the school's history.

According to the riding school, women now make up the majority of élèves, though only about four new riders are admitted in any five-year period. The second woman to follow Zeitlhofer is Assistant Rider Theresa Stefan, who joined the school in 2011.
