= Heldenberg =

- Municipality
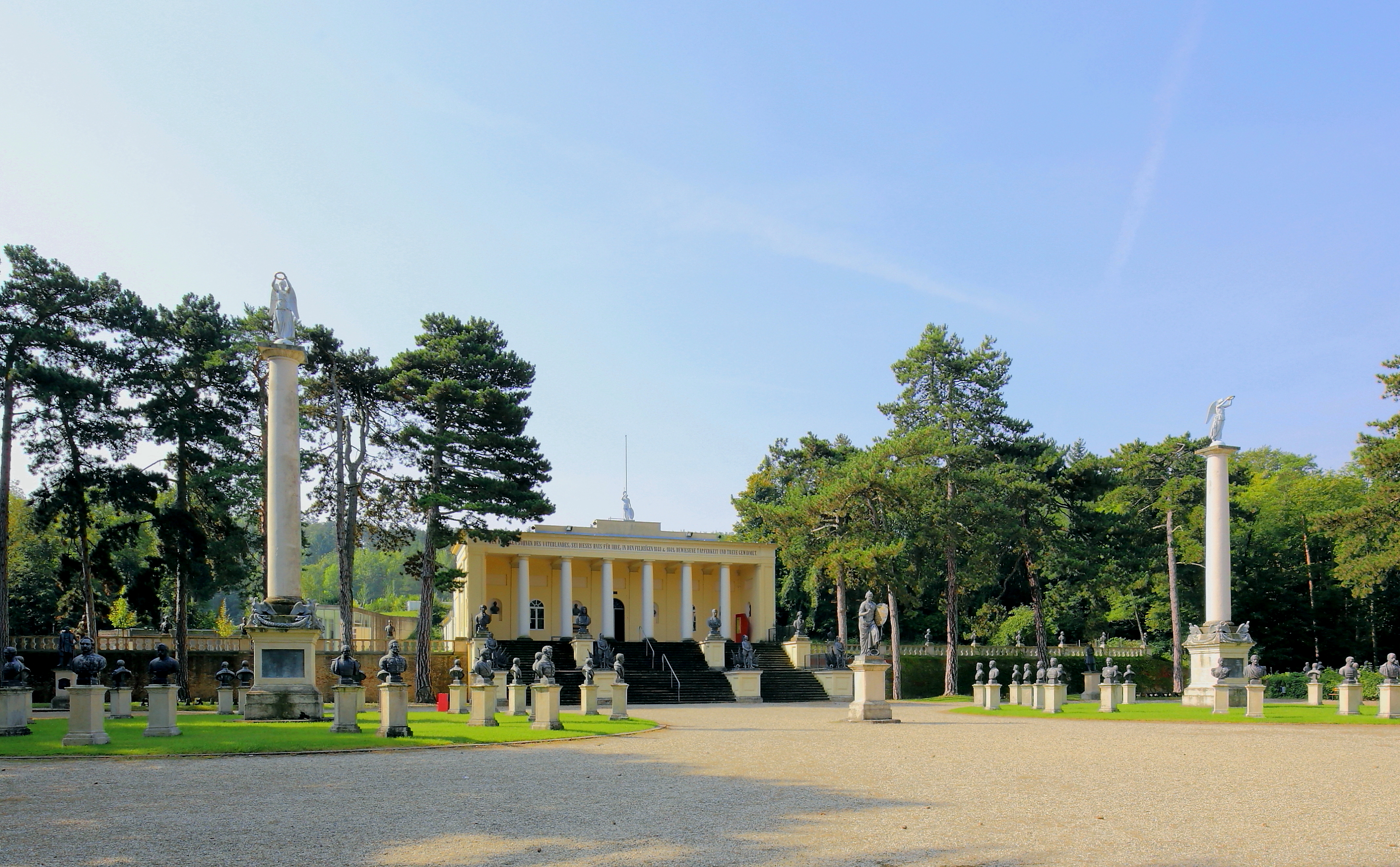
- Heldenberg Memorial

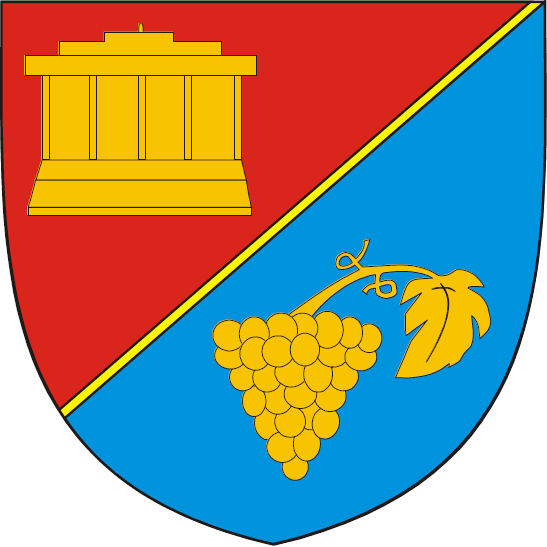
- Coat of arms

- Location within Austria
- Coordinates: 48°30′N 15°57′E
- Country: Austria
- State: Lower Austria
- District: Hollabrunn

Government
  - Mayor: Günther Brandstätter (ÖVP)

Area
  - Total: 27.4 km^{2} (10.6 sq mi)
- Elevation: 238 m (781 ft)

Population (2018-01-01)
  - Total: 1,270
  - Density: 46.4/km^{2} (120/sq mi)
- Time zone: UTC+1 (CET)
  - Summer (DST): UTC+2 (CEST)
- Postal code: 3704, 3701, 3710
- Area code: 02956
- Website: www.heldenberg.gv.at

Heldenberg is a small municipality in the district of Hollabrunn in Lower Austria, Austria, about 50 km north-west of Vienna. It is most notable for the Heldenberg Memorial.

== Geography ==
The municipality was created in the 1970s as an administrative unit encompassing the villages Glaubendorf, Kleinwetzdorf, Grosswetzdorf, Unterthern, and Oberthern. It was named for the Heldenberg (literally, Mountain of Heroes) memorial site located near Kleinwetzdorf, which was constructed in 1849 by Joseph Gottfried Pargfrieder, an army supplies merchant and land owner, to commemorate heroes of the Austro-Hungarian army.

== Sights ==
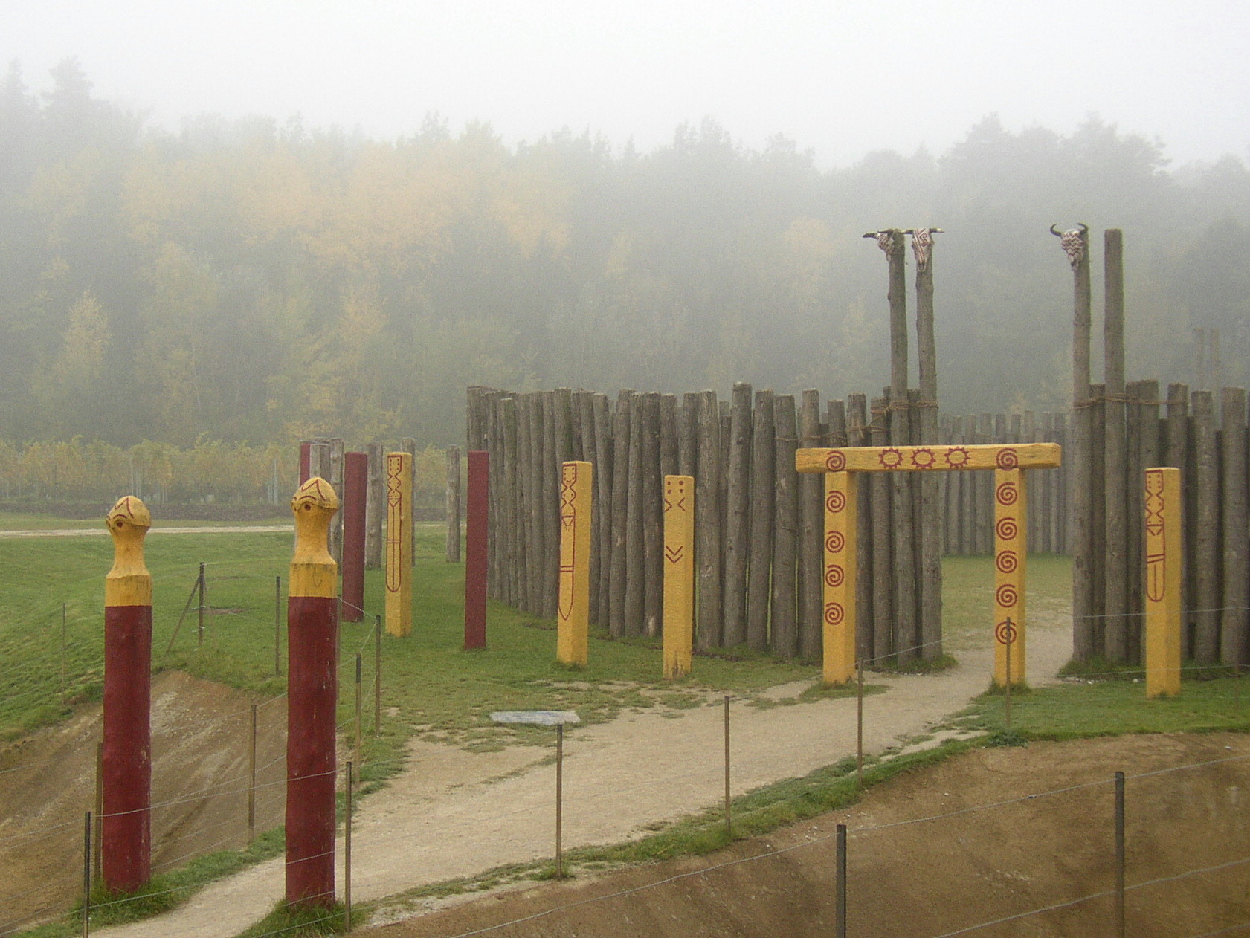
Circular Ditch site reconstruction at Heldenberg

In Glaubendorf, a neolithical circular ditch site was found through aerial photography in the 1980s. The larger of the two structures, which have not been permanently excavated, contains three ditches of 71, 90 and 109 meters in diameter, which have been made visible on the surface by planting different flowers.

The Heldenberg memorial site was renovated in 2005 for a theme exhibition. In addition to the original memorial with sculptures of emperors and military personnel, a reconstruction of a circular ditch site and an automobile museum have been added.

Near the museum, the Viennese Spanish Riding School has established their summer stables.
