= Freestyle to Music =

Horse dressage competition

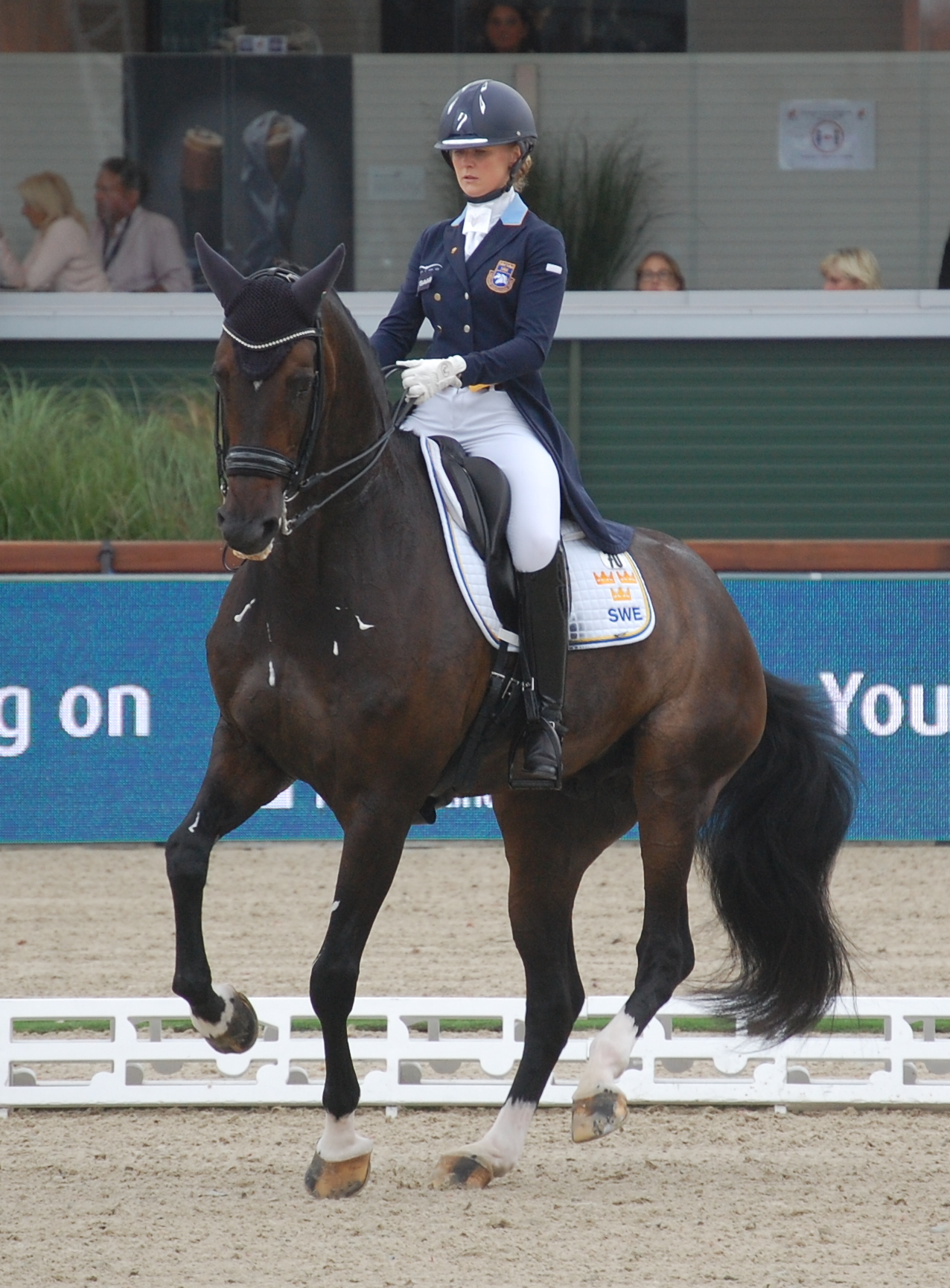
Juliette Ramel performing musical freestyle on Buriel K.H. in 2021

Freestyle to Music (from German kür, "freestyle"), originated in 1980 as a form of dressage competition in which movements are performed to music. Musical freestyle dressage entertains and appeals to both devotees of the sport and the general public, and has increased the popularity of dressage.

== History ==
In October 1980, Olympic rider Jennie Loriston-Clarke met Gaynor Colbourn who, at the age of 17, was already an established classical and session musician, composer and multi-instrumentalist in the recording and TV/film industry. Their first collaboration was a demonstration of dressage to music at Wellington Riding in Heckfield, UK, in which Colbourn played keyboards live in the arena to match every single movement of Loriston-Clarke riding Dutch Courage and Benjamin Bunny. The demonstration also featured a pas de deux with Jeremy Michaels and Neirede Goodman, the co-owner of Wellington Riding who rode Wellington Oliver. This event marked the beginnings of dressage to music and Colbourn's trademark style of playing keyboards live in order to match every movement, tempo, change and nuance, wherefore she was awarded the Merle Park Rose Bowl Award at the Goodwood International Dressage Festival.

Freestyle to Music was officially recognised by British Dressage in 1980 and the FEI after its official debut at the 1996 Summer Olympics in Atlanta and has since grown. Not only is it compulsory in equestrian Olympic competitions, but it has spread beyond the grand prix circuit to freestyle classes at local riding club competitions around the world and at all levels.

Gaynor Colbourn remains the only person to have performed live music alongside the horses, which allowed her to tailor music to each individual rider and horse. She continues to lead clinics and demonstrations including performances by top international and Olympic riders, but creates music for horses and riders at all levels, which have won freestyle classes more than 10,000 times with Colbourn's music.

== Levels ==
International Freestyle Dressage tests, organised by the FEI, include Pony Riders, Juniors, Young Riders, Intermediate I, Intermediate A/B and Grand Prix. Most National Federations (i.e. USDF, British Dressage) have their own freestyle levels which usually correspond to their established levels of training.

Each floorplan must consist of several mandatory movements and paces, depending on the level and federation, however their order and timing is free to the rider's discretion within certain margins. Additionally, movements of the same or lower level which are not listed as compulsory but are permitted may be included to increase the degree of difficulty, but are classed as "calculated risks" by the FEI due to the risk of losing points if not properly executed. Incorporating movements of a higher level than the intended level is forbidden, with penalties varying from elimination in lower levels to specific deductions and limits in FEI events. For example, an Intermediare I rider is not permitted to include passage, piaffe, or a pirouette greater than 360 degrees, and a Grand Prix rider may not do a pirouette that exceeds 720 degrees or advanced airs above the ground. If a rider does so, he or she receives a zero for the element, and in addition the score for Choreography and Degree of Difficulty will not receive a score higher than a 5.

== Scoring components ==
The scoring of the freestyle is divided up into two major sections, known as Technical Execution, and Artistic Presentation.

=== Technical ===
The technical section is made up of scores for each of the compulsory movements. The technical requirements of each level mirror the level of training and balance expected in the compulsory tests at that level. Competence and ease in the execution of the movements is crucial to a successful program.

While the technical execution is divided so as to make up half the final score (50%), the technical components of rhythm, energy and elasticity and harmony between horse and rider are scored on the artistic portion score sheet as replacement for the collective marks on a set test. Additionally, poor technical execution can negatively affect the degree of difficulty, choreography and music scores, thus the technical execution make up nominally 70% of the final score, and can affect all of the marks.

Marks are assessed for the following movements:

- Collected walk
- Extended walk
- Half-pass right (collected trot)
- Half-pass left (collected trot)
- Extended trot
- Half-pass right (collected canter)
- Half-pass left (collected canter)
- Extended canter
- 5 changes of lead every 2nd stride
- 7 changes of lead every stride
- Canter pirouette right 2
- Canter pirouette left 2
- Passage (minimum 20m on one track) 2
- Piaffe (minimum 10 steps straight) 2
- Transitions Passage-Piaffe and Piaffe-Passage
- Entrance and halt at the beginning and end of the test

=== Artistic ===
The Artistic score is usually divided into 5 sections at international competitions, They are:

- Rhythm, Energy and Elasticity
- Harmony between horse & rider
- Choreography
- Degree of Difficulty
- Choice and Interpretation of the music

Choreography
The choreography must incorporate the technical criteria for the level but is otherwise open to creative choices and highlighting the horse's strong points. Good marks are awarded to inventive choreography which contains movements not taken directly out of the set tests, but has an element of surprise and adventure to their placement. However, there should still be a logical order and flow to the movements, such as symmetry and without too many changes between the paces. A chaotic freestyle would score worse than a basic one.

Music
When Colbourn and Loriston-Clarke originated the sport in 1980, the whole ethos was for dressage to music to be beautiful, as with ballet and ice dancing. Early competitions were judged by prima ballerina Merle Park and ice skater Robin Cousins to ensure the judging of the artistic element was by a highly experienced performer. The music chosen will depend on the horse's movement, type, personality, and the rider's own musical tastes but should serve to accentuate all of them. Music for freestyles can be found in a variety of styles such as classical music, show tunes, movie scores, orchestral versions of pop and contemporary music. A copyright license is required for all music played during a competition. Generally, it is preferred that the music for all three gaits should be of the same genre, but is not required. It is more important that the music flows seamlessly through the transitions. The interpretation of the music means that it should enhance the horse's way of going and match the tempos of his gaits. The music should suggest the movements; transitions should correspond to the transitions in the music. It is imperative that the choreography interpret the music. Movements and figures should start and finish at obvious musical phrases.

Degree of difficulty
The level of difficulty should correspond to the horse's abilities so that the ride looks easy. A horse which is more advanced will be able to perform more complex movements and combinations. A good freestyle program is entertaining to the audience and pleasing to the eye.
