= Pas de deux (dressage) =

Equestrian performance

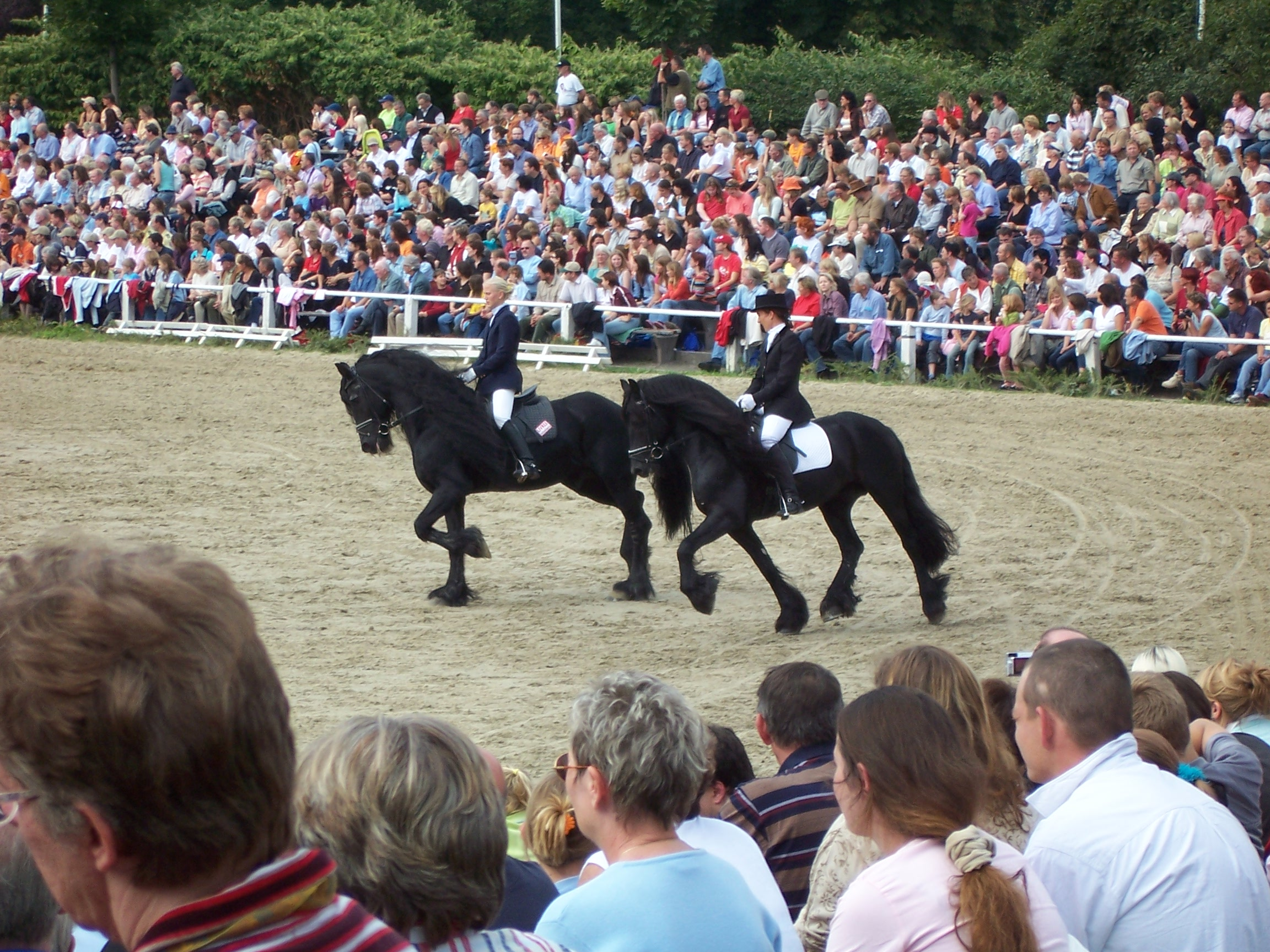
A pas de deux with two Friesian horses.

A pas de deux is an equestrian performance using two horses. The horses perform dressage movements, usually mirroring each other, and almost always accompanied by music. Pas de deux are often performed in exhibitions at special events, and are also used by professional acts, particularly the Spanish Riding School.

== Semantics ==
"Pas de deux" means "step of two" in French. The term pas de deux is also used in ballet to mean a dance duet.

== In Exhibition ==
Pas de deux are often seen at exhibitions. For special events, they are often performed by two riders who compete alone, and choose to choreograph a piece to challenge their ability to harmonize with another horse-and-rider pair. Pas de deux are also used by professional equestrian acts, such as the Spanish Riding School and Cavalia.

== In Competition ==
Both the USDF and British Dressage allow pas de deux in competitions. They are scored similarly to musical kur, also known as freestyle dressage. The choreography must include the elements required at the level that the pair chooses to do. The performance is judged based on the choreography and how well it is performed by each horse-and-rider pair, as well as on the suitability of the music and harmony between the pairs. Pas de deux performed in competition tend to be more conservative in music and turnout than those performed at exhibitions.

== See also ==
Quadrille
