= Musical freestyle =

Musical freestyle can refer to:

- Musical canine freestyle, performing synchronized routines with one's dog
- Musical kur, equine dressage to music
- Freestyle music, a form of dance-pop or electronic dance music
- Freestyle rap
