= Gag bit =

Bit for riding a horse

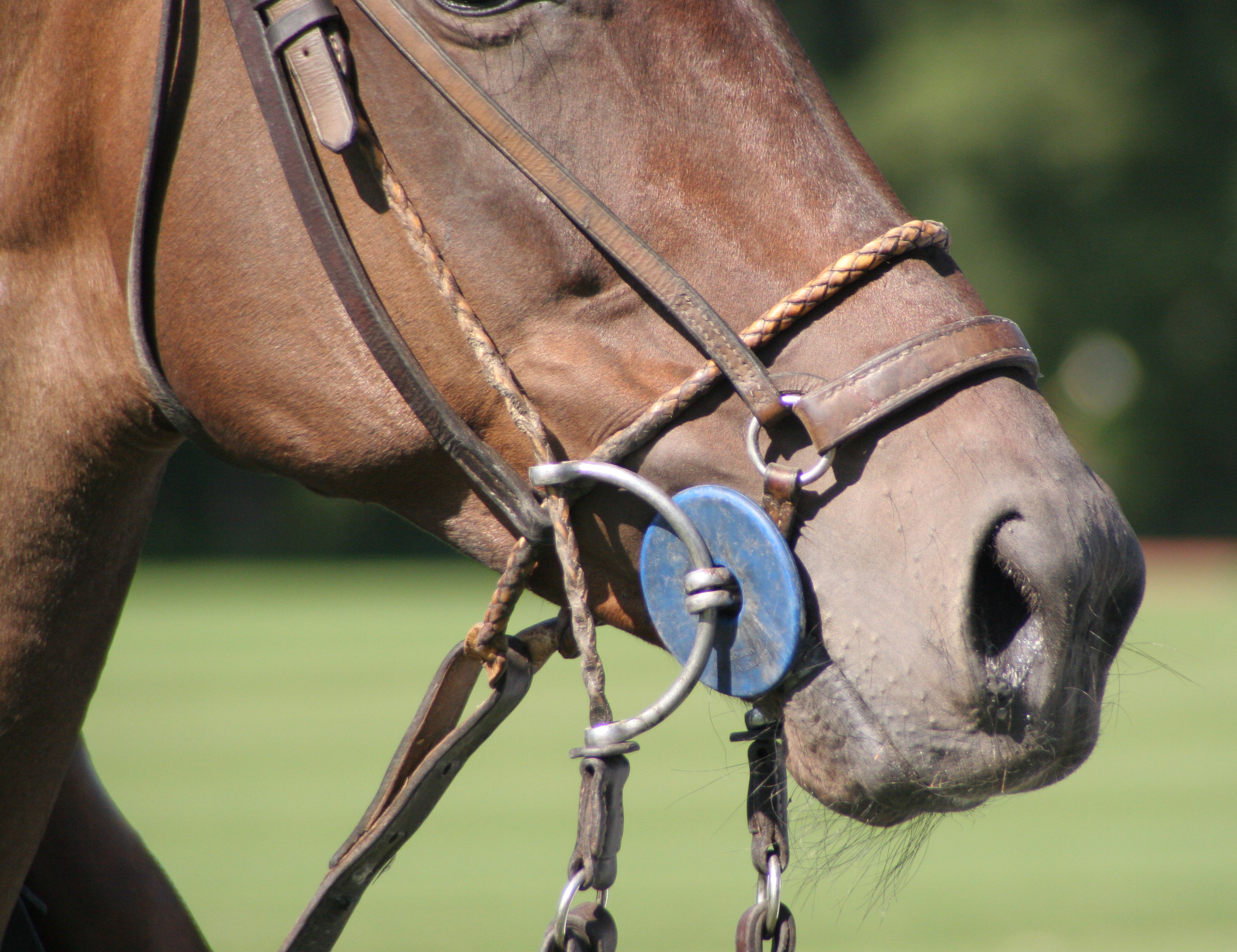
Gag bit used on a polo pony

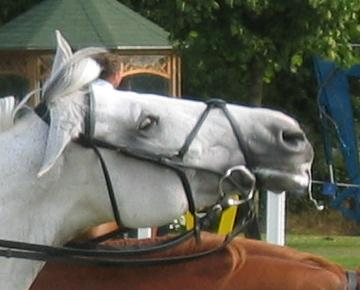
The "gag snaffle", used with two reins, showing the sliding cheekpieces

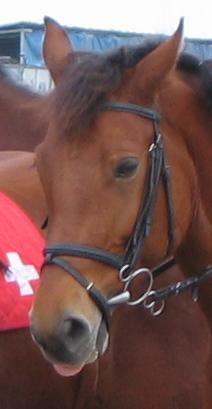
Dutch gag

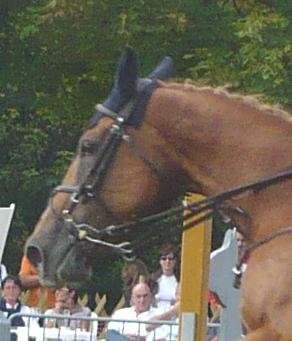
"Elevator" gag bit. The top rein has a snaffle effect, the bottom a gag effect.

The gag bit is a type of bit for a horse with sliding cheekpieces of rolled leather or chord that run through the bit rings, providing leverage that pulls the bit up into the corners of the horse's mouth. It is considered a severe bit, often used to provide more braking power. Some styles of gag bit are integral to a special bridle, known as a gag bridle; others are used with a standard bridle. Inside the horse's mouth, the gag bit may be any type of mouthpiece, though a mullen-mouth (straight-bar) mouthpiece is considered kindest. There are also faux gags, which have a similar action and have shanks rather than rope or cord.

== Usage ==
The gag bit works on the horse's lips and poll simultaneously. The pressure on the lips tends to make the horse raise its head, which may cause it to work in a hollow frame or jump "flat". Gags also utilize poll pressure, which is primarily a head-lowering action. Combined with the head-raising action of the lip pressure, this gives the horse conflicting signals, making the gag a controversial choice.

Gag bits are used mainly on horses that are strong pullers, for horses who "bore down against the riders hand", and sometimes for horses who work "on the forehand". Gag bits are most commonly seen in polo, eventing (especially for cross-country), show jumping, and hacking, mainly for increased control at times where a horse may be excited or try to run off with the rider. A "stronger" bit uses a lot more concentrated pressure than a regular snaffle or a bitless bridle, so they must only be used by riders with gentle, steady hands, or the horses mouth will be pulled on unnecessarily, which can cause a lot of pain and confusion. Critics of the bit note that a rider's soft hands do not change the mechanics of a gag, and argue that a leverage bit may be a more ethical option.

They are not permitted at any level of dressage (only snaffles or double bridles are permitted in dressage), since dressage riders are trying to get the horse to come down onto the bit, and want to encourage the horse to accept contact. Additionally, the horse is supposed appear in harmony with the rider in dressage, and a gag bit gives the impression that it is not. Gags are also never seen in the hunter arena, again because riders wish to portray that the horse is an easy ride, and because the ideal is a long, relaxed frame with the neck stretched out, rather than a high neck and hollow back.

Gag bits are also occasionally seen in western-style competition, usually in the form of a sliding mouthpiece on a shanked curb-style bit (similar to the American gag).

The gag bit is normally (and ideally should be) used with two sets of reins; one on the bit ring that does not apply gag leverage, and the other on the small ring attached to the cord or rolled leather strap of the gag bridle cheekpiece. This allows for the bit to be used as a normal snaffle bit, with gag action used only when needed. Polo players, who must ride with the reins in one hand and cannot make instant fine adjustments, often use a gag bit with draw reins. When the rein is on the bottom ring of the gag bit, the leverage is much stronger, and should be used very carefully.

The configuration considered least severe for a gag bit involves using two reins combined with a leather curb strap. If a running martingale is used, it must only be attached to the top snaffle rein to prevent creating additional conflicting signals. If a gag bit is used without a curb strap, it will often over-rotate. This over-rotation causes the shank or cheekpieces to tilt too far forward, which neutralises the intended leverage action and can cause the mouthpiece to slide upward excessively, pinching the horse's lips and pulling the bit uncomfortably high into the corners of the mouth.

== Types ==
Running gag
Similar in shape to a snaffle, with a mouthpiece and a ring on either side. Each bit ring features two holes: one at the top and one at the bottom. Gag cheekpieces, made of rounded leather or rope, are threaded through these holes. The ends of these cheekpieces, after passing through both holes, terminate in a metal ring to which the reins are attached. When rein pressure is applied, the bit slides upward and rotates slightly in the mouth. Severity is influenced by the ring size, as larger rings can allow for more pronounced gag action. Examples of the gag snaffle include the Balding gag, which utilizes a loose-ring design, and the Cheltenham gag, which utilizes an eggbutt design.

A "gag snaffle" is not a true snaffle bit, although it can be adjusted to act like one if the rider attaches a rein directly to the bit rings rather than the sliding gag cheekpieces. Due to the mechanics of the running gag, strong rein pressure can cause the bit to lift two inches or more in the horse's mouth, risking severe discomfort, pinching, or tearing at the corners of the lips.

Dutch gag
Also known as the four-ring gag or Pessoa gag. It is similar to the elevator bit, except the cheekpieces consist of a series of vertically stacked rings. The bridle cheekpieces attach to the small top ring to generate poll pressure. The large ring directly below attaches straight to the mouthpiece and acts similarly to a standard snaffle bit. The lower rings, of which there are usually one or two, accommodate a second rein to provide the gag action. The lower the second rein is placed on the ring stack, the stronger the leverage action and the more the mouthpiece raises along the cheekpiece.

American gag or elevator bit
Features an "H"-shaped frame consisting of an upper shank ring for attaching the bridle's cheekpieces, a lower shank for the gag rein, and a middle loop where a standard snaffle rein can be attached. The mouthpiece slides upward along the curved sides of the bit shank as rein pressure is applied, concentrating force on the corners of the horse's mouth and encouraging a head-raising response. Unlike the multi-option design of the Dutch gag, the American gag features fixed rein attachments with no alternative height options. The bit simultaneously applies downward pressure to the horse's poll. Because the upward sliding action of the mouthpiece directly opposes the downward pressure on the poll, critics and bitting experts note that this "pseudo-gag" action sends highly conflicting signals to the horse. Due to the high potential for severe discomfort, pinching, or mouth trauma if the horse resists the dual pressure vectors, it is considered an exceptionally harsh tool that is generally recommended only as a last resort in extreme control situations.
