= Impulsion =

Forward movement of a horse

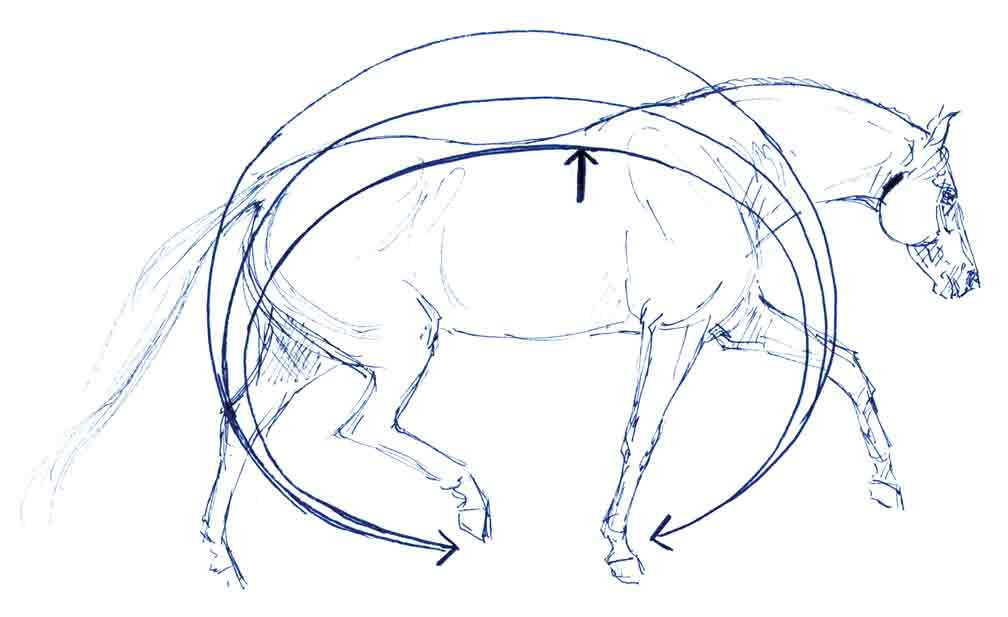
Impulsion can only occur if the horse is coming properly up through the back and hindquarters, as seen here.

Impulsion is the movement of a horse when it is going forward with controlled power. Related to the concept of collection, impulsion helps a horse effectively use the power in its hindquarters. To achieve impulsion, a horse is not using speed, but muscular control; the horse exhibits a relaxed spinal column, which allows its hindquarters to come well under its body and "engage" so that they can be used in the most effective manner to move the horse forward at any speed.

The concept and term was first written about by practitioners of dressage, but an ability to move with impulsion is a desired goal in most other equestrian disciplines. Impulsion occurs when a horse is under human control and is one of the desired goals in horse training, but it may sometimes be exhibited by a horse in a free and natural state. Impulsion allows any horse gait to be more elastic and light, and also provides the animal with the power needed to perform complex movements, including the piaffe and the airs above the ground. Within the dressage world, there is an unresolved debate whether impulsion can only occur in gaits which have a period of suspension, the trot and canter, or if it occurs at any gait, including the walk and the ambling gaits.

== Definitions ==
There are competing definitions of impulsion. The 2007 USDF rule book defines it as "...Thrust. Releasing of the energy stored by engagement. The energy is transmitted through a back that is free from negative tension and is manifested in the horse's elastic, whole-body movement. The classical dressage trainer Nuno Oliveira described impulsion as, "...a mental and physical state of the horse to obey the rider's demands as fast as possible, to move forward, and to maintain his forward impulsion without support from the aids..." and ""Impulsion means to maintain the energy within the cadence." Another definition is that "[a] horse is said to have impulsion when the energy created by the hind legs is being transmitted into the gait and into every aspect of the forward movement. A horse can be said to be working with impulsion when it pushes off energetically from the ground and swings its feet well forward." The USEF states that impulsion is "the transmission of an eager and energetic, yet controlled propulsive energy generated from the hindquarters into the athletic movement of the horse. Its ultimate expression can be shown only through the horse’s soft and swinging back to be guided by a gentle contact with the rider’s hand."

In competitive dressage circles, impulsion is defined by the German Training Scale, which states that impulsion is only possible in gaits having a moment of suspension, such as the trot and canter, but not the walk. This is the current position of the USDF. Others differ, however. Oliveira described impulsion as necessary at all paces: "If your horse goes from walk to trot without changing the head and neck position, the walk had good impulsion." Outside the world of competitive dressage, impulsion is considered necessary at all gaits, encouraged in gaited horses, and in horses used for western riding. Impulsion at the walk is encouraged and judged in many lower level dressage and combined driving competitions that do not necessarily follow the current trends in international judging.

== Purpose and requirements ==
Impulsion is very important in all equestrian disciplines, because good impulsion allows the horse to effectively utilize the power in its hindquarters.

Impulsion is particularly important in dressage. It not only makes the horse's gait more elastic, light, and expressive, but provides the animal with the power needed to perform the required movements. This is especially true for those requiring collection, such as passage, piaffe, pirouette, tempi changes. In jumping poor impulsion is often linked to horses failing to clear obstacles.

Good riding is needed to create impulsion in any horse, although some horses may be built in such a way that they can more naturally create impulsion (such as those with an "uphill" build). The horse must be forward, yet relaxed, and coming correctly "on the bit" by coming up through the back. Additionally, a horse must be straight, with "throughness." The rider should use correct driving aids, and contain the energy created by the engaged hind legs. Ideally, this is accomplished through persuasion of the horse, not bullying.

Impulsion occurs in all gaits: the walk, the trot, and the canter and even the ambling gaits of gaited horses. Because the walk has no moment of suspension, it is a difficult gait to perform with impulsion. Impulsion at various gaits may not always appear the same. In the walk, it is seen when the hindquarters are engaged and the gait is "purposeful yet relaxed." The USEF describes impulsion at the piaffe as follows: "The piaffe must always be animated by a lively impulsion and characterized by a perfect balance. While giving the impression of being in place there may be a visible inclination to advance, this being displayed by the horse’s eager acceptance to move forward as soon as he is asked."
