= Draw reins and running reins =

Pieces of horse riding equipment

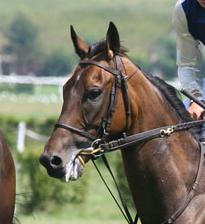
Running reins, a style also sometimes called a German martingale or Market Harborough. Horse is also wearing a tongue-tie, which is not usually standard equipment.

Draw reins and running reins are pieces of riding equipment used for training that use the mechanical advantage of a 'single movable pulley' to cause the horse to bring its head down and inward. While a regular rein is the strap that attaches to the bit and is held by the rider, these types of reins slide through the bit ring, adding leverage to the rider's hands and arms, allowing the rider to force the horse's head into a desired position.

Usage of the term in English riding and Western riding disciplines refers to slightly different designs that nonetheless work on essentially the same leverage principles.

== English Riding ==
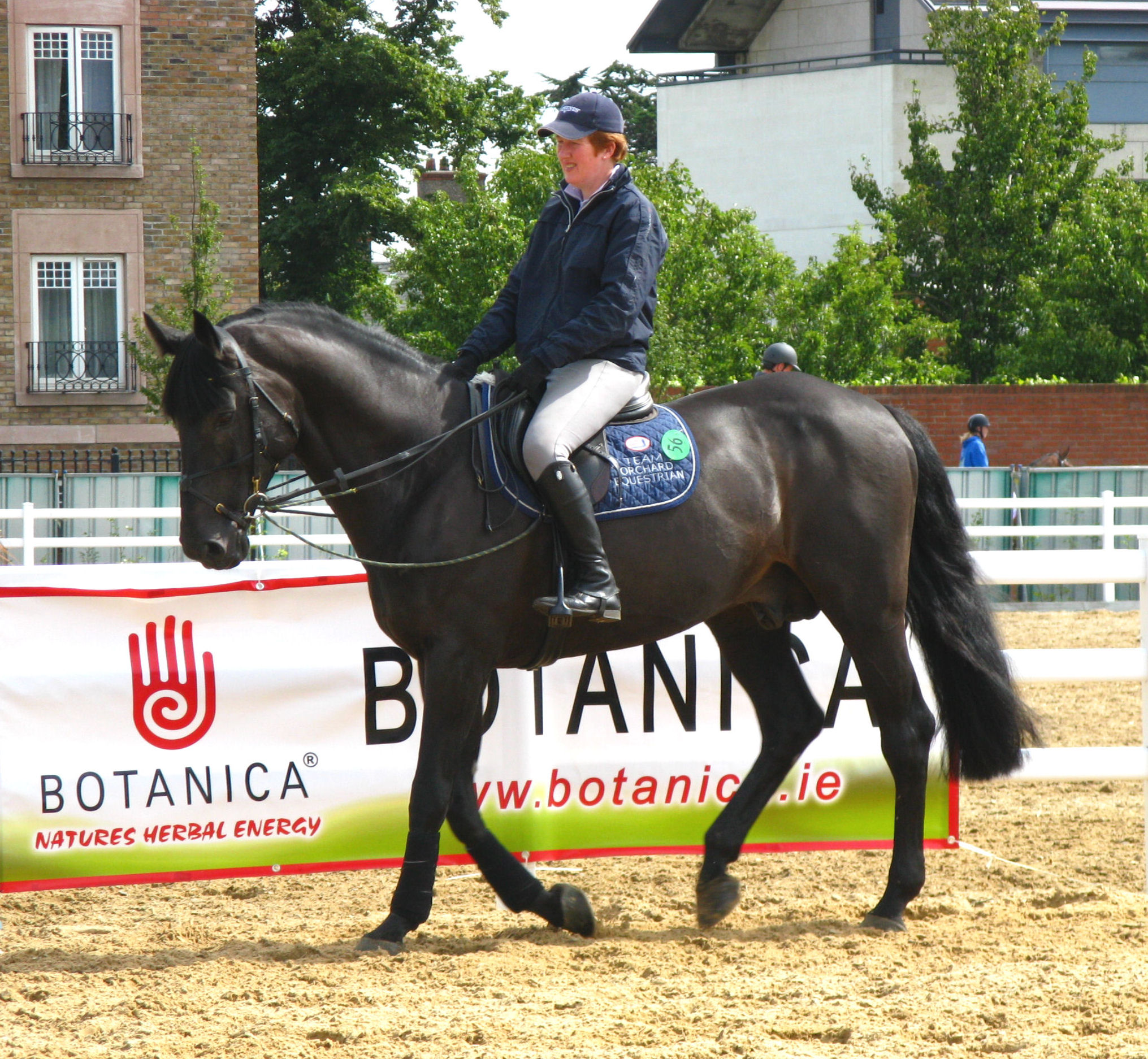
Horse with draw reins

The terms "draw reins" and "running reins" are often used interchangeably in the English disciplines. The terms most often refer to reins which go from the rider's hand, through one bit ring (inside to outside), and attach to the girth. Usually this style is called a "running rein," though the term "draw rein" is also sometimes used. Some styles attach directly to a regular snaffle rein, which limits the degree of force applied, while others slide freely and with little limit to the leverage that can be applied. Another style, also called a "draw rein," runs from the rider's hands, through the bit ring (outside to inside), over the poll, through the other bit ring, and back to the rider's hands, without attaching to the girth.

In Hunt seat style English riding, these devices originally developed as a two-rein bitting system. One set of reins is an ordinary direct snaffle rein, and the other is the running or draw rein. The rider holds these reins in a manner similar to a double bridle, usually with the snaffle rein below the fourth finger and the running or draw rein between the third and fourth fingers, although there are variations on this. When riding in this fashion, the rider should ride predominantly on the snaffle rein. However, riders and trainers may often be observed using only the running or draw rein, in many cases with the snaffle rein completely absent from the bridle. Riding with draw reins alone is a controversial practice among English riders.

== Western Riding ==
Draw reins in the western riding disciplines are always attached to the rings of the cinch (a western-style girth), usually on each side of a western saddle, run through the bit rings (either inside to outside or vice versa, there is no firm rule, though the rein moves more smoothly if the inside goes to the girth and the outside to the hand), and then to the hands of the rider. They are rarely used in a two-rein system, usually are used alone or used with the regular bridle reins allowed to lay slack and not held by the rider. While use of the standard draw reins presents only mild controversy in western circles, a controversial use of this rein in western riding is its use on a curb bit, a practice that applies incorrect leverage, is dangerous, and creates an effect that some consider abusive.

== Polo ==
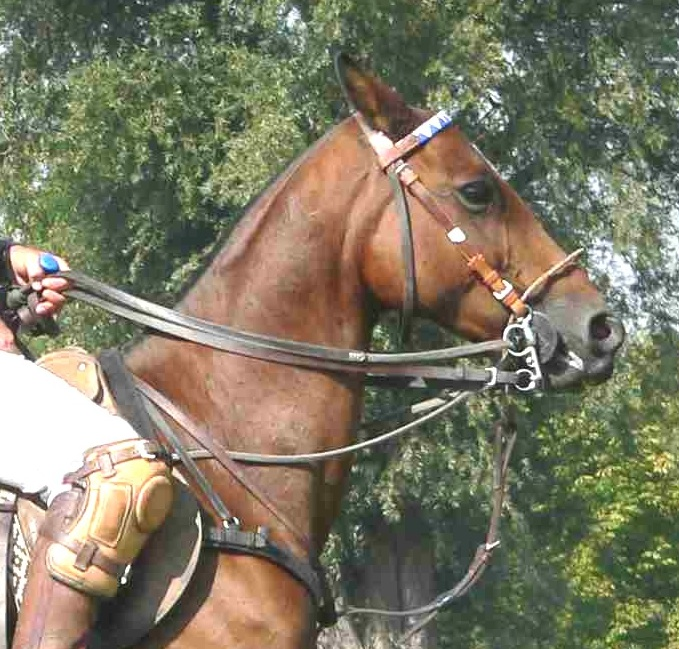
Polo pony wearing a Pelham bit with draw reins

Draw reins are common in polo, connected through the "snaffle" bit ring of a Pelham bit or a gag bit in lieu of a direct rein, to the saddle billets. The draw reins have a direct rein action. A second pair of reins, on the "curb" bit ring, provides a lever action. When the rider pulls all four reins (both pairs) together, the draw reins become slack, transferring tension to the other pair of reins. However, in the sport of polocrosse, draw reins are forbidden with the exception of Market Harborough.

== Uses ==
Running reins and draw reins are intended for use when the horse is performing an undesired behavior that cannot be corrected with less extreme equipment, and it is best practice to stop use as soon as the desired response is given.

Running reins (or western-style draw reins) are used by many trainers to teach the horse to give to rein pressure, and most horses respond by bringing the head in and lowering it. They may also provide additional control of heavy-mouthed horses, though it can also become a "crutch" that a rider becomes dependent on using at all times.

English style draw reins that run over the poll have a gag bit-like action. They encourage the horse to raise its head, although they may cause slight pressure on the poll, and are therefore good for certain horses that buck and plunge with the head lowered, attempt to run away by first lowering the head, and for horses that pull, lean on the bit, or have learned to lower the head and stop to unseat the rider.

Western style draw reins work similarly to the English style running rein, in that they encourage the horse to bring its head down and in. However, they may apply more leverage and because western riders rarely use the regular rein, they offer less relief to the horse. Some trainers even run draw reins between the front legs and attach them to the cinch underneath the belly in order to get the horse to travel with the low and controversial "peanut roller" style headset popular in some western pleasure classes. However, horses can learn to evade draw reins by overflexing and putting their head practically on their chest, then charging ahead or, conversely, balking and refusing to move forward at all.

== Misuses and Dangers ==
There are many riders who use leverage devices, which also can include not only draw reins and running reins, but also the running martingale, to force the horse into position. However, this is incorrect usage.

Misuse usually involves the rider pulling the horse's head in to achieve a "headset" rather than getting the animal correctly on the bit. Like the equally controversial practice of rollkur, the horse does not flex properly at the poll, but rather flexes improperly at a lower neck vertebrae. This practice often results in a horse that is working in a "headset" or "outline" that, to the inexperienced observer appears acceptable, but the horse has no self-carriage or suppleness and does not properly engage its hindquarters.

These pieces of equipment can have very detrimental effects if they are adjusted tightly, used strongly, or if used for long periods of time. Horses may become hard-mouthed and heavy, and they will begin to travel on the forehand if the rider can not keep sufficient impulsion. Additionally, many horses that are continuously or incorrectly ridden in draw or running reins may never learn to engage the hind quarters and lift their withers for self-carriage, and this habit may permanently damage their training. In extreme cases, horses may develop neck and back pain from being forced to hold an artificial position for long periods of time. The incorrect use of draw reins will produce horses who are overflexed on short necks with correspondingly flat backs and disengaged hind legs.

It was this improper flexion that ruined the reputation of their inventor, William Cavendish, 1st Duke of Newcastle-upon-Tyne.

That being said, competent riders who correctly and tactfully use the draw and running reins can have success in correcting specific problems in horses that require retraining to get rid of bad habits. These are often the riders who use the equipment the least, because they can achieve correct results through good riding instead of gadgets.
