= Piaffe =

Stationary stylized collected trot

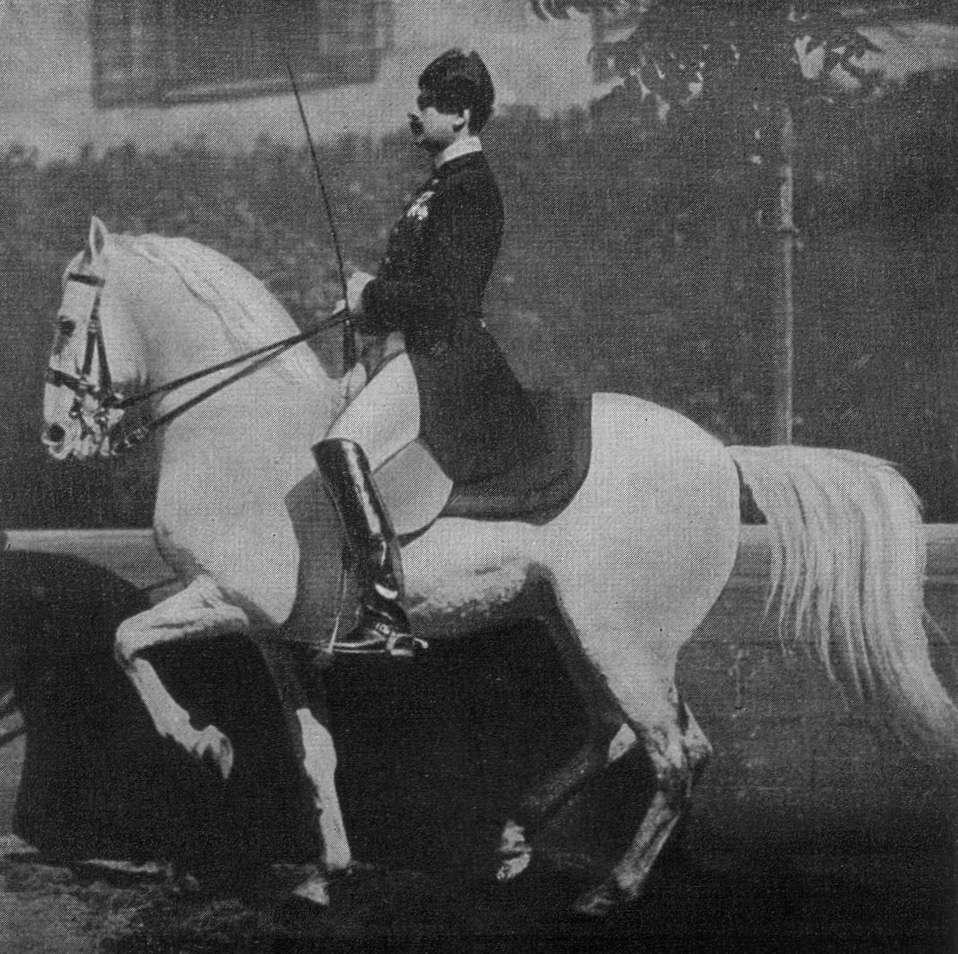
Chief Rider Meixner on Neapolitano Bona

The piaffe (French pronunciation: [pjaf]) is a dressage movement where the horse is in a highly collected and cadenced trot, in place or nearly in place. When performed properly, the center of gravity of the horse is towards the hind end, with the hindquarters slightly lowered and great bending of the joints in the hind legs. The front end of the horse is highly mobile, free, and light, with great flexion in the joints of the front legs, and the horse remains light in the hand. The horse retains a clear and even rhythm, shows great impulsion, and has a moment of suspension between the foot falls. As in all dressage, the horse performs in a calm manner and remains on the bit with a round back.

The piaffe was originally used in battle to keep the horse focused, warm, and moving, ready to move forward into battle. In modern times, the piaffe is mostly taught as an upper level movement in Classical dressage and as a Grand Prix level movement. Additionally, it is needed to develop the levade and from that, the airs above the ground.

== Correct piaffe work ==
Video animation: Horse performing the piaffe, in place.

The following are elements of the correct piaffe:

- The piaffe is straight and comes from the rider containing the horse's desire to go forward. The legs do not move out to the side or cross.
- The horse lowers his hindquarters, collects, and raises the shoulders by taking weight onto the hindquarters, rather than hollowing the back and piaffing with the hindquarters trailing out behind.
- Bending of the joints is not always a good indication of true collection (and therefore a correct piaffe). It is possible to perform a piaffe-like movement with good bend in the legs while the horse remains hollow and on the forehand. This can especially be seen in horses trained to trot in place by holding them back while asking the hindlegs to bend by applying the whip on the hocks. The horse will bend the hocks, but will not lower the hindquarters.
- The horse is not to raise the hind legs higher than the front, which comes when the horse is on the forehand, nor show exaggerated bending of the front legs without true collection.
- The horse remains relaxed and supple. An incorrect piaffe has short, jerky steps.
- The horse does not move his fore legs backward toward his hind legs, so that they are more under his body, but rather keep them perpendicular to the ground.
- The horse remains at or in front of the vertical, with his poll as the highest point.
- The horse maintains the rhythm and tempo of the trot.
