= British Dressage =

- VAT ID no.: 344026
- Registration no.: 1155352
- Website: www.britishdressage.co.uk

British Dressage is the organisation which oversees all affiliated dressage competitions and training in the United Kingdom. British Dressage is a member of the British Equestrian Federation.

In addition to the usual dressage competitions, British Dressage also oversees the British Young Riders Dressage Squad (BYRDS) and all para-equestrian dressage.

== History ==
Dressage as a competitive sport in the UK was first organised by the British Horse Society in 1961 under the BHS Dressage Group. In its first year it had 123 members and held eight competitions.

British Dressage as a separate organisation was set up in January 1998, and now has over 18,000 members and organises more than 2,500 days of competition per year.

== Governance ==
The current Chief Executive Officer of British Dressage is Jason Brautigam. The current president is the Jennie Loriston Clarke, and the current vice-president is Desi Dillingham (President of the British Horse Society). Carl Hester and Lee Pearson are Honorary Patrons of British Dressage.
