= On the bit =

Horseback riding term

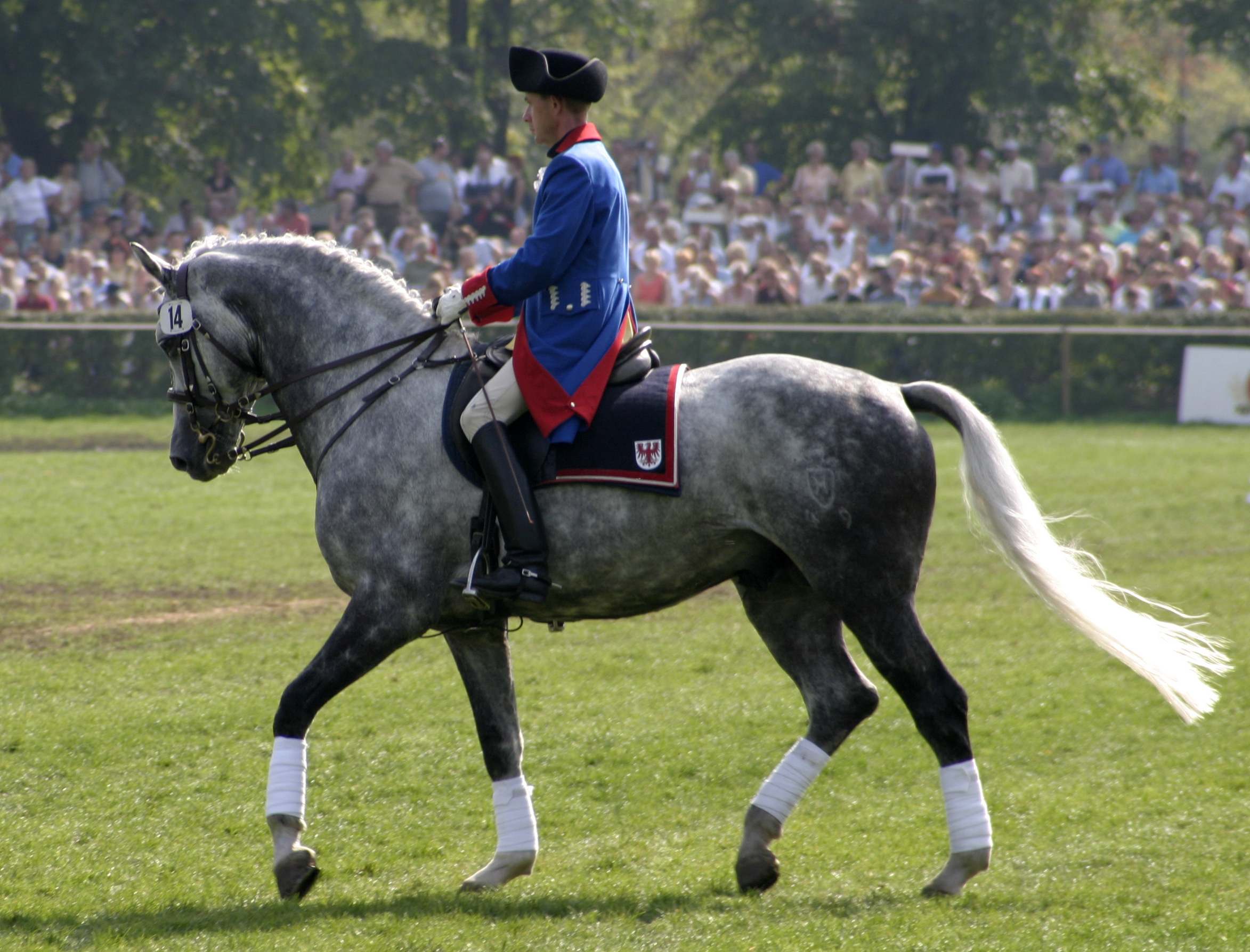
A horse correctly "on the bit" with a soft contact, due to impulsion causing him to raise his back.

The phrases "on the bit", "behind the bit" and "above the bit" are equestrian terms used to describe a horse's posture relative to the reins and the bridle bit. A position on the bit is submissive to the rider's rein aids, given through the bit. When a horse is behind the bit, the head is tucked too far down and rearward. If above the bit, then the head is too high. Some horses will avoid contact with the bit, rather than correctly accepting it, and come "behind the bit". This may occur either due to evasion by the horse (so it does not have to listen to the rider) or because the rider is using the bit too strongly or physically trying to pull the horse on the bit. It is a very common fault if the rider "see-saws" on the reins.

== Technique ==
Being on the bit requires the horse to engage the hips and raise the back, which it cannot do when its head is pulled rearward. The neck is connected to the shoulders, and impeding the shoulders prevents extension of the forehand. This will cause the horse to hollow its back. A horse is properly placed, on the bit, by creating impulsion (pushing power) from the rider's driving aids, and then containing this forward energy in the hands, via the reins and bit. Impulsion causes the horse to engage its hind end, lift its back, and finally (when it becomes submissive and accepts contact with the bit, without resistance) results in the horse flexing at the poll, maintaining an elastic contact that is equal on both sides of the bit.
