= Quadrille (dressage) =

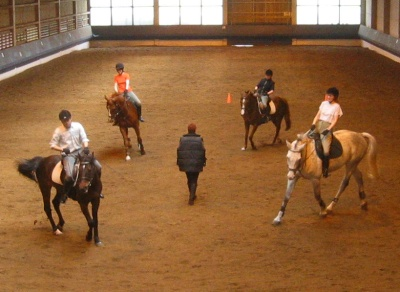
A quadrille.

Quadrille is a choreographed dressage ride, commonly performed to music, which is often compared to an equestrian ballet or to a drill team. The basic elements of quadrille riding came from the linear formations used in warfare dating back to the 1650s. A minimum of four horses are used, although many times more (always in pairs), which perform movements together. Quadrille may be ridden as a performance, such as those given by the Spanish Riding School, or as a competitive test with judging. At the highest level, quadrille includes movements such as shoulder-in, travers, half-pass, passage, flying changes, and canter pirouettes.

== See also ==
- Pas de deux
- Schoolquadrille
