= Riding figures =

Paths drawn in a riding arena to train a horse

Riding figures are prescribed paths a horse is ridden on in a riding arena, usually for training purposes. Figures may also be performed out in a field or other open area, but a riding arena provides markers that can help indicate the correctness in the size or shape of a figure.

The riding school, showing its centerline from A to C, and two quarterlines.

== Purposes of ring figures ==
Ring figures are a valuable training aid, giving the rider feedback as to his horse's training and weaknesses. A poorly executed ring figure may point out where the rider is lacking in control and areas in which the horse needs additional training. For example, when riding down the diagonal, a rider may struggle to keep his horse on the correct path, suggesting issues with straightness. A poorly performed 20-meter circle may indicate that the horse is not truly between the aids, perhaps falling out through a shoulder, or that the rider is sitting crookedly.

Figures are required components of dressage tests, are used in reining competition, and may also be asked for in equitation classes. Additionally, jumping courses may often be broken up into riding figures.

It is important to work the horse on figures in both directions to ensure an equal build of muscle on either side.

== Full-school and half-school ==
=== Full-school ===
Full-school

The horse and rider travel along the rail all the way around the side of the arena, without changing direction. Full-school riding is often used for warming-up, to get the horse thinking forward, and is a good technique to use during the training process for naturally dull horses.

Additionally, it is preferred for riding lessons, giving the instructor a chance to critique each member of the class as they ride in front of her. For beginner lessons, full-school riding eliminates the need for them to turn, allowing them to focus on something simple, such as basic position. However, in a lesson group, it requires the riders to correctly rate their horse's pace, to prevent the animal from running up behind the horse in front.

Half-school along the width

Full-school riding is also seen when showing on the flat, with all riders judged as they ride in one direction, and then asked to change direction before being judged in the other direction. Again, this provides an easy way for the judge to assess all riders in the ring.

=== Half-school ===
As its name suggests, the horse and rider travel along one half of the arena, either along the width or the length. Half-school along the width is occasionally seen in lessons, especially if the group is small, giving the instructor a chance to critique all riders. It is also helpful when two classes are conducted in the same arena at once.

Riding along the width is mainly used for training purposes. For example, it allows the rider to focus on straightness as he rides down the centerline, and to use the 10-meter half-circles to ask for rebalancing and engagement.

== Circles ==
All circles are measured by their diameter. A 20-meter circle refers to a circle with a diameter of 20 meters.

=== 20-meter circle ===
The 20-meter circle

The 20-meter circle is one of the most important training figures in dressage, first seen in the simplest tests possible, and continued through Grand Prix. It is one of the first ring figures taught to beginner riders and young or green horses. Due to its size, it does not require that the horse or rider have incredible skills to ride moderately well, but circle-work should increase in quality as the horse and rider become more adept. This circle is a great test of the horse's suppleness and the rider's ability to keep the horse on the aids. Incorrect position or application of the aids, such as overuse of the inside rein, will often become apparent on the 20-meter circle.

The 20-meter circle fits very well into both the small (20 x 40 meter) and standard (20 x 60 meter) arenas, allowing the rider to use points on the wall to determine if the circle is the correct size and shape.

The 20-meter circle should be round, not egg or pear-shaped. This means that each side of the arena that touches the circle should only be met at a single point, and should not be ridden along for any period of time. Many novice riders go too deep into the corners of the arena, causing their circle to bulge out. Bulging or falling in both indicate that the horse is not correctly bent on the circle, or that he is leaning against the rider's leg and falling in or out.

The 20-meter circle can be used in all steps of training. Variations may include shoulder-in or haunches-in on the circle, transitions between and within gaits, extension and collection, and eventually something as advanced as flying changes, including tempi changes, on the circle.

=== 10- and 15-meter circles ===
The 10-meter circle

These two circles require the horse to be more balanced than the 20-meter circle, especially the 10-meter circle, and are therefore asked for later in training. The small diameter of the 10-meter circle requires extra bend, and if the horse is not correct in his bend, the problem will be pronounced as he struggles to balance, usually falling in on the circle with his shoulders. It will also accentuate any problems the rider may have, such as an uneven seat.

The 15-meter circle is usually asked for in dressage tests at the canter, and the 10-meter at the trot. 10-meter circles at the canter require a very balanced and attentive horse.

The 10-meter circle is a favorite training tool, as it can be used to increase impulsion and bend. It is often used when beginning to train three-track movements such as shoulder-in and haunches-in, as the circle gives the horse the correct bend needed for these movements. After performing a 10-meter circle, the rider keeps the bend and simply asks the horse to continue along the long side of the arena instead of continuing around on a circle.

In conjunction with the use of the 20-meter circle, riders may spiral-in to a 10-meter circle from a 20-meter, being sure to keep the horse correctly bent. This exercise helps with engagement, as the horse must reach under himself as he changes the size of the circle and the path he is on.

=== Volte and Pessade ===
The volte is a tiny circle, having a diameter of 6 meters by definition, although trainers may vary the size of the volte depending upon the size of the horse. Of all the circles, it requires the most balance from the horse. Voltes are excellent training tools, encouraging engagement and power. However, the horse should not be pressed to perform a smaller circle than is comfortable for him, as it will sacrifice balance and bend, and possibly distress the horse.

The pessade is a half-volte, in which the hindquarters are kept to the inside, therefore making a smaller circle than the forehand. It is often used as a precursor to the pirouette, when executed at the walk and canter. It may also prepare the horse to move into the renvers.

== Changing of direction ==
=== Across the long diagonal ===
Across the long diagonal

The rider goes from one of the letters near the corner (K, H, M, or F) to the letter on the long side near the opposite corner (for example, K to M, or H to F). The rider does not go from corner to corner. There should be a stride or two of straightness between riding in the corner and beginning to go across the diagonal, reaching the other side and going into its corner. When the rider is going across the diagonal, his horse should stay perfectly straight through his body and on his line, meeting "x" as he crosses the centerline. The rider should also be sure not to overshoot the letter he is riding to, a common fault, and instead aim to hit the wall of the arena a couple of feet before the letter.

Riding across the long diagonal can be used to change direction and is especially helpful in a large lesson, as it allows the group to change direction with minimal risk of running into each other. More importantly, it is a good training tool to test the horse's straightness. Certain movements, such as flying changes, are sometimes taught across the diagonal, as is the lengthening of the stride. This figure appears in most dressage tests.

=== Across the short diagonal ===
Across the short diagonal

The rider goes from one K, H, M, or F to the opposite long side, but aims for either E or B. This can also be performed in the opposite direction, for example, riding from E to M. The rider should always go to the letter in the direction of travel (so a rider going clockwise around the ring would ride from B to K, not B to H).

This has similar uses as the long diagonal, although it is less commonly seen in use. It can be considered slightly more advanced, as the turns come up faster than when the rider goes across the long diagonal. However, this may be beneficial for horses that tend to get quicker and quicker across the long diagonal.

=== Half-volte to wall ===
Half-volte to wall

Changing direction through a half-volte is usually taught quite early on in a rider's career. In this figure, the rider riding on the long side of the arena performs a half-volte toward the inside of the ring, before gradually coming back to the wall. It is not asked for in dressage tests, but is one of the most common ways judges ask for a change of direction in the show ring, as it provides a fairly quick change of direction.

This figure (also known as the 'tear drop') can also be used for more advanced training. For leg-yielding, the half-volte is used to get increased engagement from the horse, and the animal is then leg-yielded back to the track instead of being allowed to drift back there. The horse has a relatively short distance to cover and is generally naturally drawn to the wall. In half-pass, the volte can be used to establish bend, before asking for a half-pass back to the wall. It is helpful to remember this shape when riding through it.

=== Through a circle ===
Change of direction through a circle

This change of direction is one of the more advanced, and is often asked when a rider wishes to change the direction of his circle, without losing the benefits of the bend. The rider starts on a 20-meter circle. When he wishes to change direction, which he may do at any point on the circle, he performs a 10-meter half-circle, continuing in the same direction of travel, to the center point of his original circle. He then immediately performs a 10-meter circle in the opposite direction, from the center point back to the 20-meter circle.

Properly ridden, the horse will have a correct bend in both half circles, changing flawlessly at the center point. The horse should not lose rhythm or forwardness. Both 10-meter half-circles should be of equal size and shape, not grossly large or too flat.

This change of direction generally increases the engagement of the horse. It requires the horse to be on the aids, and is helpful in pointing out any rider problems, as the quick change of direction for 10-meter to 10-meter circle will easily allow the horse to fall in or out if the rider is not keeping him straight. If the two 10-meter half-circles were not the same size, there is likely a training or riding error.

== Lines ==
=== Down the centerline ===
Down the centerline, without changing directions

Down the centerline (changing directions)

The horse is ridden down the imaginary centerline of the arena, from the letters C to A or vice versa. This is one of the best ways to test the straightness of the horse, as the sides of the arena usually guide horses into straightness, while the centerline is very open. The centerline may also be used as a way to change direction, although it is generally not as preferred as the other options.

The horse should first and foremost stay straight through his whole body, without dropping a shoulder or haunch inward. The horse should also not "wobble" side to side, but continue in a straight direction. When viewed from the top, the horse would be perfectly bisected by the centerline.

One of the most common faults of the novice rider is to overshoot the centerline, turning too late from the long side of the arena. This may be helped if the rider starts looking toward the centerline well in advance.

This movement is asked at least twice in every dressage test, as the horse first enters the arena, and at the very end of the test. As there is always a judge sitting at C, it is easy for him to judge the horse's straightness in the test as he views the approaching animal head-on (unlike some movements, such as those across the diagonal, which may be a bit harder to judge on straightness). Since the movement is both the first and last movement in the test, it provides the first and final impressions. Therefore, the rider should be extra careful to practice coming down the centerline.

=== Down the quarterline ===
The rider rides down the quarterline (which falls halfway between the centerline and the long side of the arena). This has similar benefits as riding down the centerline, as it tests for straightness.

Riding down the quarterline is especially useful in training for leg-yield, as the rider can leg-yield from the quarterline to the wall, requiring only a few steps of leg-yield in a direction. Eventually, the rider may ask the horse to leg-yield back and forth several times, from the wall to quarterline to wall.

== Looping figures ==
=== Figure-eight ===
Figure-8

As the name suggests, the rider performs a figure-8 in the arena. It is useful in that it may be used to change direction, and is also used as a training tool.

This figure is usually ridden as the shape of two 20-meter circles, rather than having any straight sections to it, as the horse then has the benefit of the bending on the circles. The rider should therefore pay attention to similar faults and errors of the 20-meter circle. Additionally, the change of direction at X should be smooth.

The figure-8 can be used for warm-up, encouraging the horse to go forward while working him in both directions. It is a fairly simple figure, and may be applied to both beginner riders and young horses. For jumping riders, a simple exercise with fences laid out along a figure-eight can help with bending and quick reflexes.

=== Serpentine ===
A 3-loop serpentine, with several strides of straightness between loops

S-shaped figure, usually with three or four loops, although for training purposes, there may be many more. The size and shape of the loops may vary, including loops that have several strides of straightness between each bending phase and loops with only one stride of straightness between changes of bend. Loops may also be more "bow-tie" in fashion, looping back over themselves. In all cases, however, the loops should be of equal size and shape to the others in the serpentine.

The serpentine is used mainly as a training tool for bending, as it requires at least two changes of bend across the riding school. Change of bend should always be smooth, and the horse should not fall in or out while looping. The serpentine may be used to change direction if it has an even number of loops.

Serpentines are also asked for in some dressage tests. They are pretty basic and can be taught to young horses. They are good for improving steering in inexperienced riders who have basic steering skills. However, no horse or rider should be pushed to do more loops than they are ready for.

=== Shallow loop/Single serpentine on long side ===
Shallow loop on the long side

This is not so much a serpentine as a slight curve in the track as the rider goes along the long side. He should gently move off the track a few meters before returning to it.

This figure is especially useful in teaching counter-canter. The horse is asked for the correct lead before moving him off the track a few strides. He is then asked to return to the track without changing to the "correct" lead and instead perform the counter-canter.
