= Eventing =

Equestrian triathlon

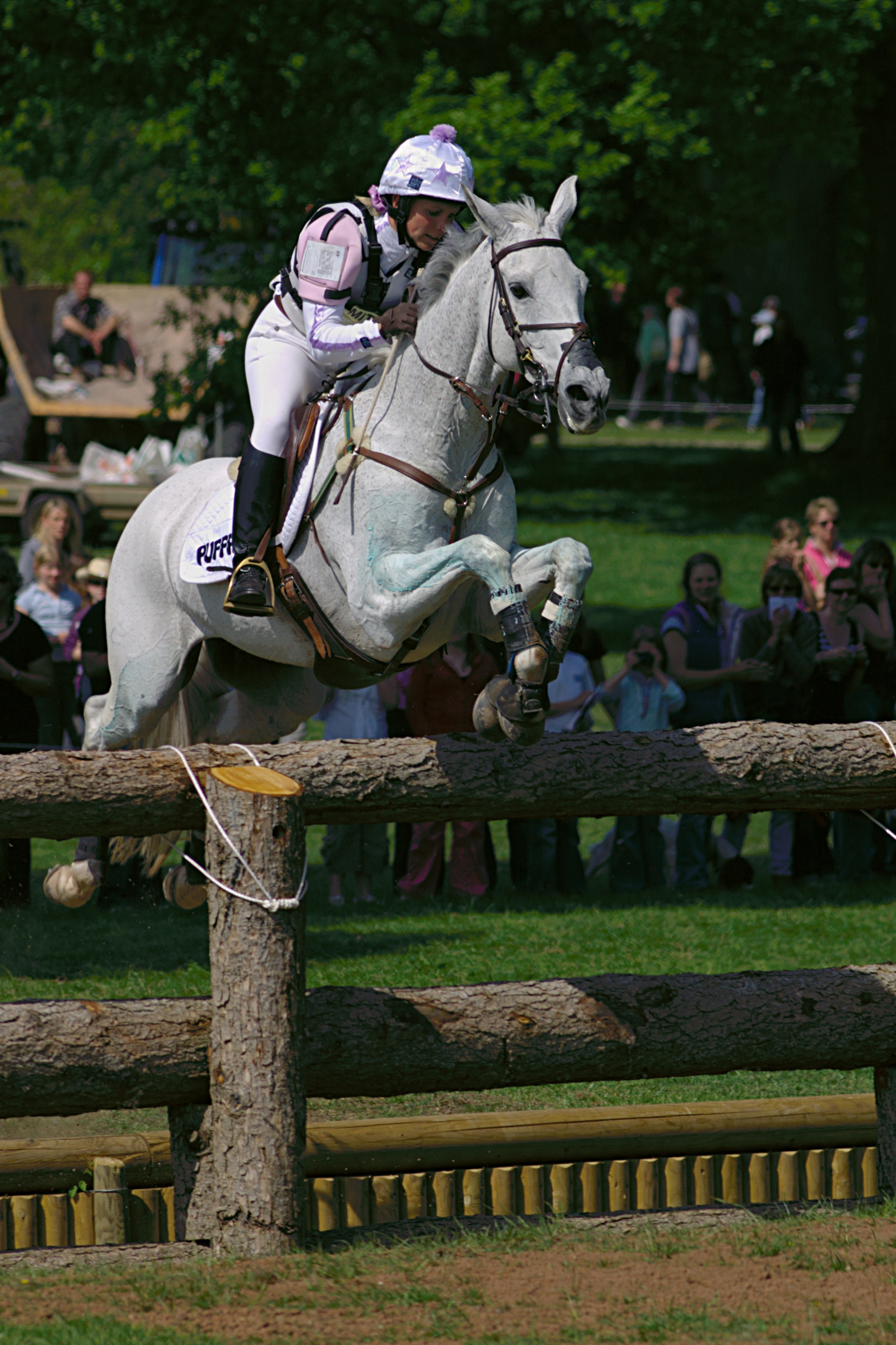
- The cross-country phase of Eventing
- Highest governing body: International Federation for Equestrian Sports (FEI)
- Nicknames: Three-day eventing; horse trials; combined training

Characteristics
- Team members: Individual and team at international levels
- Mixed-sex: Yes
- Type: Outdoor
- Equipment: Horse; Horse tack; Horse jumping obstacles
- Venue: Arena (dressage and show jumping stages); Cross-country, open terrain course over various obstacles

Presence
- Country or region: Worldwide
- Olympic: 1912

eventing training

Eventing (also known as three-day eventing or horse trials) is an equestrian event where the same horse and rider combination compete against other competitors across the three disciplines of dressage, cross-country, and show jumping. This event has its roots in a comprehensive cavalry test that required mastery of several types of riding. The competition may be run as a one-day event (ODE), where all three events are completed in one day (dressage, followed by show jumping and then the cross-country phase) or a three-day event (3DE), which is more commonly now run over four days, with dressage on the first two days, followed by cross-country the next day and then show jumping in reverse order on the final day. Eventing was previously known as Combined Training, and the name persists in many smaller organizations. The term "Combined Training" is sometimes confused with the term "Combined Test", which refers to a combination of just two of the phases, most commonly dressage and show jumping.

== Phases ==
Eventing is an equestrian triathlon, in that it combines three different disciplines in one competition set out over one, two, or three days, depending on the length of courses and number of entries. Eventing contains a total of 3 phases.

This sport follows a similar format in Australia, Canada, Ireland, United Kingdom, and the United States. It is recognized internationally by the FEI.

=== Dressage ===
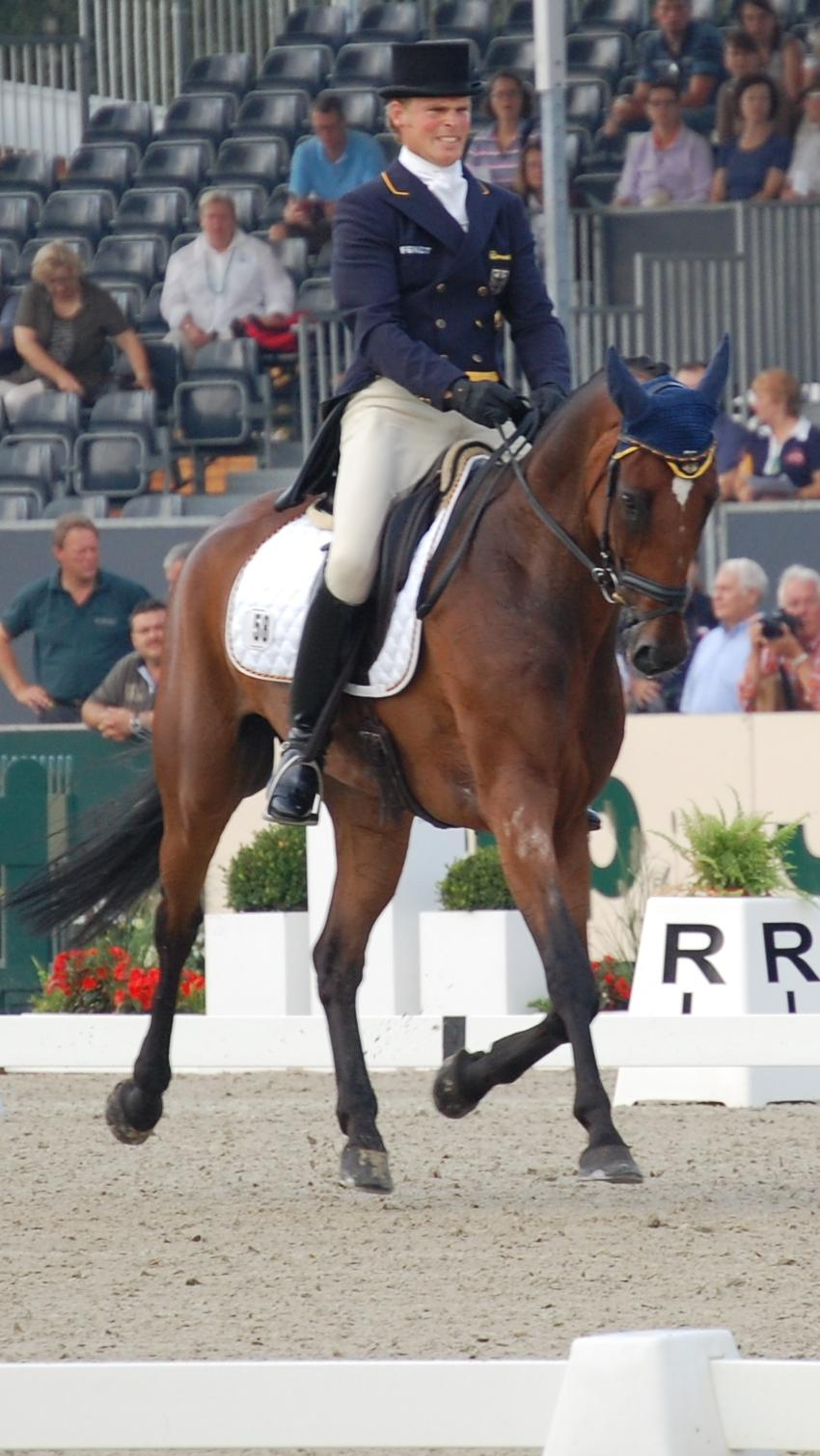
Dressage

The dressage phase (held first) consists of an exact sequence of movements ridden in an enclosed arena (20×60 m for International 3DE but usually 20×40 m for ODE). The test is judged by one or more judges, who are looking for balance, rhythm, suppleness, and most importantly, the cooperation between the horse and rider. The challenge is to demonstrate that a supremely fit horse, capable of completing the cross-country phase on time, also has the training to perform in a graceful, relaxed, and precise manner. Dressage work is the basis of all the other phases and disciplines within the sport of eventing because it develops the strength and balance that allow a horse to go cross-country and show jump competently.

At the highest level of competition, the dressage test is roughly equivalent to the United States Dressage Federation Third Level and may ask for half-pass at trot, shoulder-in, travers, collected, medium and extended gaits, single flying changes, and counter-canter. The tests may not ask for Grand Prix movements such as piaffe, canter pirouette, or passage.

Each movement in the test is scored on a scale from 0 to 10, with a score of "10" being the highest possible mark and with the total maximum score for the test varying depending on the level of competition and the number of movements. A score of 10 is very rare. Therefore, if one movement is poorly executed, it is still possible for the rider to get a good overall score if the remaining movements are very well executed. The marks are added together and any errors deducted. To convert this score to penalty points, the average marks of all judges are converted to a percentage of the maximum possible score, subtracted from 100 and the multiplied by a co-efficient decided by the governing body.

- Once the bell rings the rider is allowed 45 seconds to enter the ring or receive a two-point penalty, then an additional 45 seconds, for a total of 90 seconds, or is eliminated.
- If all four feet of the horse exit the arena during the test, this results in elimination.
- If the horse resists more than 20 seconds during the test, this results in elimination.
- If the rider falls, this results in elimination.
- Errors on course:
  - 1st: minus 2 marks
  - 2nd: minus 4 marks
  - 3rd: elimination

=== Cross-country ===
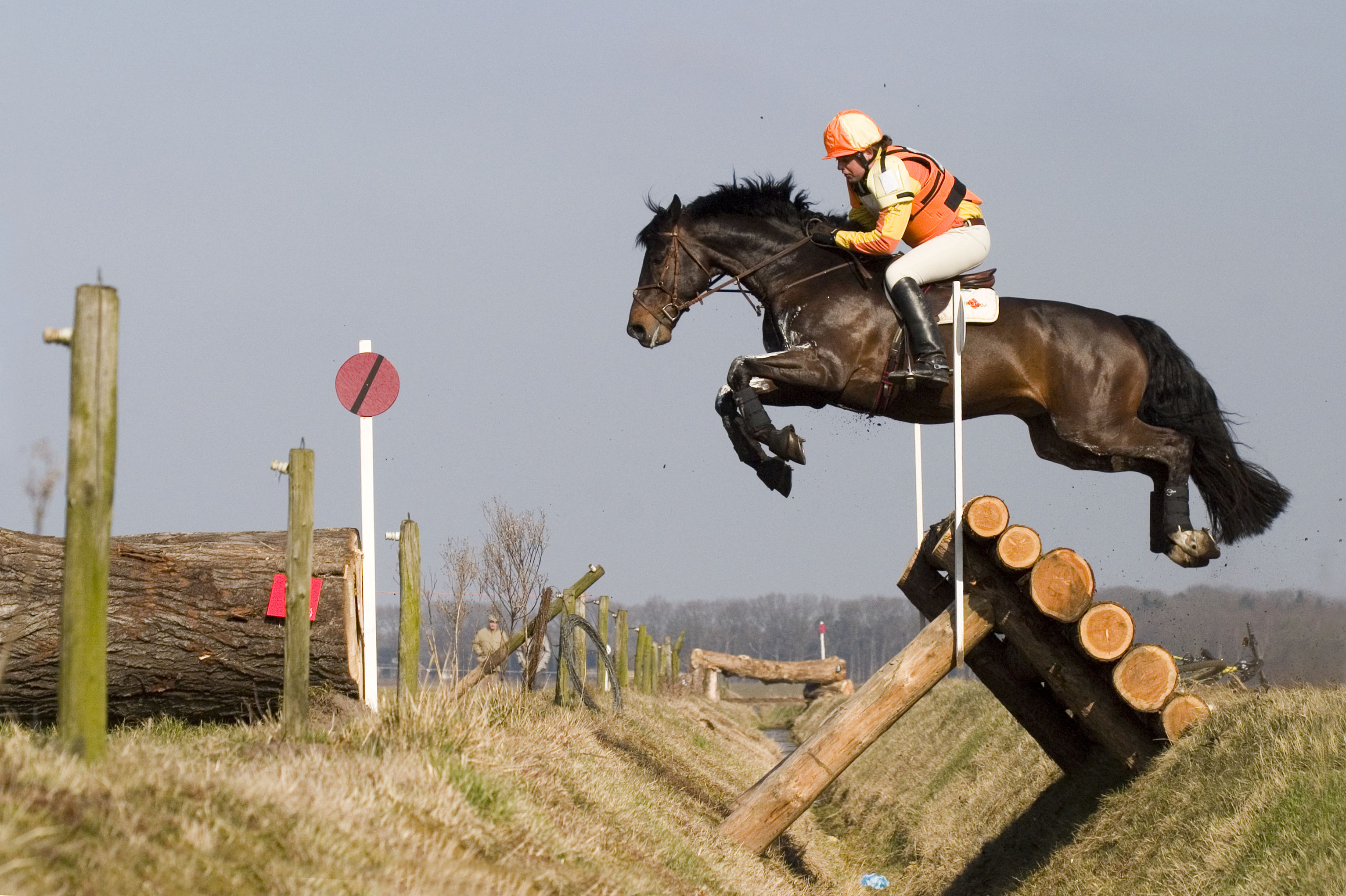
A cross-country jump over a ditch

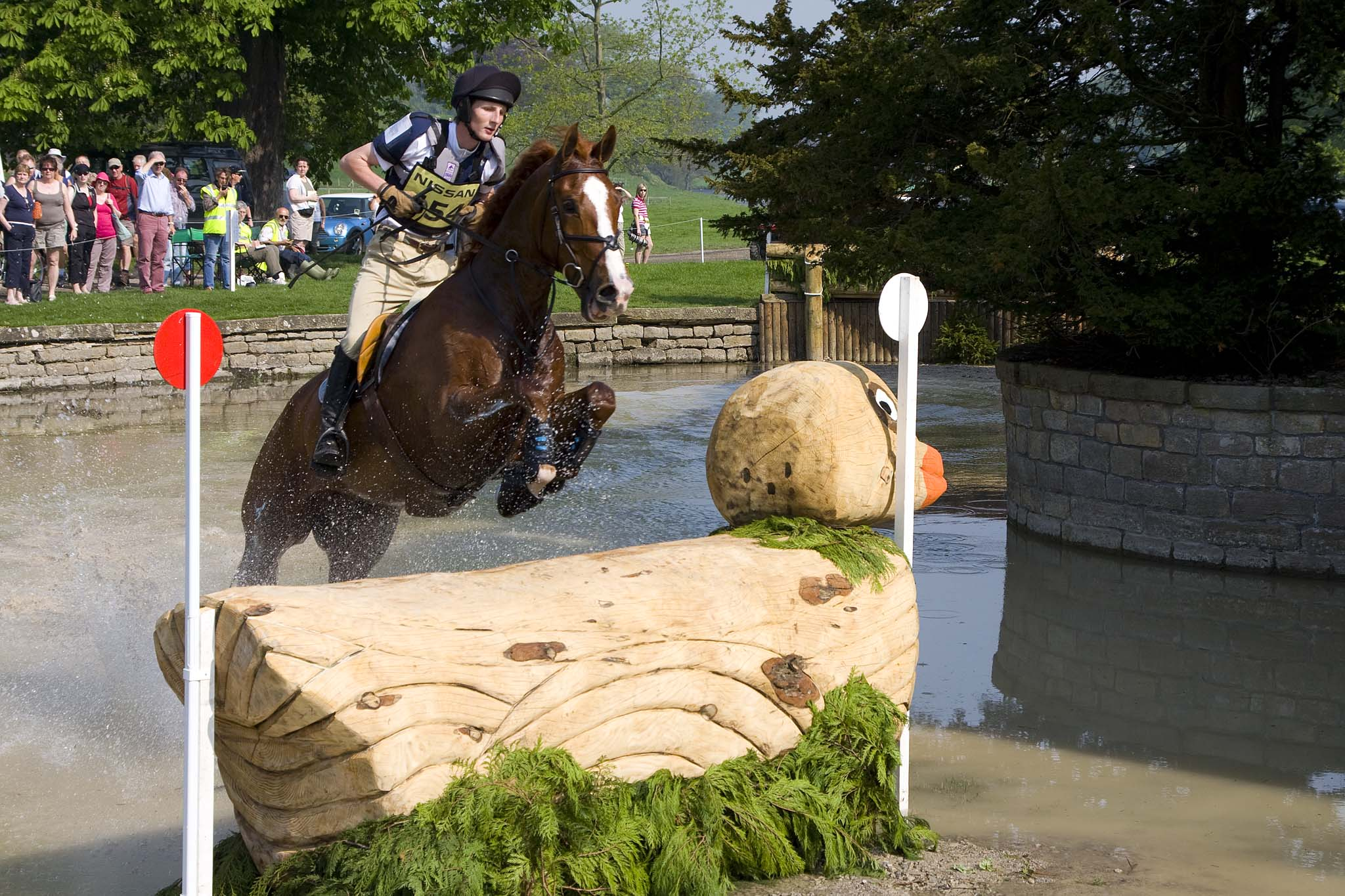
A jump out of water is a popular course design

The next phase, cross-country, requires both horse and rider to be in excellent physical shape and to be brave and trusting of each other. This phase consists of approximately 12–20 fences (lower levels), or 30–40 at the higher levels, placed on a long outdoor circuit. These fences consist of very solidly built natural objects (logs, stone walls, etc.) as well as various obstacles such as ponds and streams, ditches, drops and banks, and combinations including several jumping efforts based on objects that would commonly occur in the countryside. Sometimes, particularly at higher levels, fences are designed that would not normally occur in nature. However, these are still designed to be as solid as more natural obstacles. Safety regulations mean that some obstacles are now being built with a "frangible pin system", allowing part or all of the jump to collapse if hit with enough impact. Speed is also a factor, with the rider required to cross the finish line within a certain time frame (optimum time). Crossing the finish line after the optimum time results in penalties for each second over. Riders are usually allowed to wear a stopwatch to enable them to monitor their progress against the optimum time. At lower levels, there is also a speed fault time, where penalties are incurred for horse and rider pairs completing the course too quickly (riders who are judged to be deliberately slowing down e.g. trotting between fences to avoid penalties for going too fast can be eliminated). For every "disobedience" (refusal or run-out of a jump) a horse and rider incur on course, penalties will be added to their dressage score. After four disobediences altogether or three disobediences at one fence the pair is eliminated, meaning they can no longer participate in the competition. A horse and rider pair can also be eliminated for going off course, for example missing a fence. If the horses shoulder and hind-quarter touch the ground, mandatory retirement is taken and they are not allowed to participate further in the competition. If the rider falls off the horse they are eliminated. However, in the US this rule is currently being revised for the Novice level and below. The penalties for disobediences on cross-country are weighted severely relative to the other phases of competition to emphasize the importance of courage, endurance, and athleticism. Fitness is required as the time allowed will require a strong canter at the lower levels, all the way to a strong gallop at the higher events.

In recent years, a controversy has developed between supporters of short and long format three-day events. Traditionally, three-day events had dressage, endurance, and show jumping. Endurance day consisted of 4 phases: A, B, C and D. Phases A and C were roads and tracks, with A being a medium-paced warm up to prepare the horse and rider for Phase B, a steeplechase format at an extremely fast pace over steeplechase-style fences. Phase C was a slow-paced cool down coming off of phase B, in preparation for the toughest and most demanding phase, D, or cross-country. Before embarking on phase D, in the "ten-minute box", horses had to be approved to continue by a vet, who monitored their temperature and heart rate, ensuring that the horse was sound and fit.

Three day events are now offered in the classic format, with endurance day, or short-format, with no steeplechase (phase B) or roads and tracks (phases A and C). The 2004 Olympic Summer Games in Athens, Greece chose the short format, due to lack of facilities, time and financing, which sparked a large debate in the eventing community whether to keep the steeplechase phase or just offer cross-country. Today, most events are run short-format. In the United States the "classic format" remains a popular option for the Novice, and Training levels of competition at select events.

In 2008, the rules regarding safety in the sport were changed. One change stated that a fall anywhere during the cross-country phase resulted in elimination, even if the rider was galloping on course and not approaching a jump, or in the middle of a combination.

==== Scoring ====
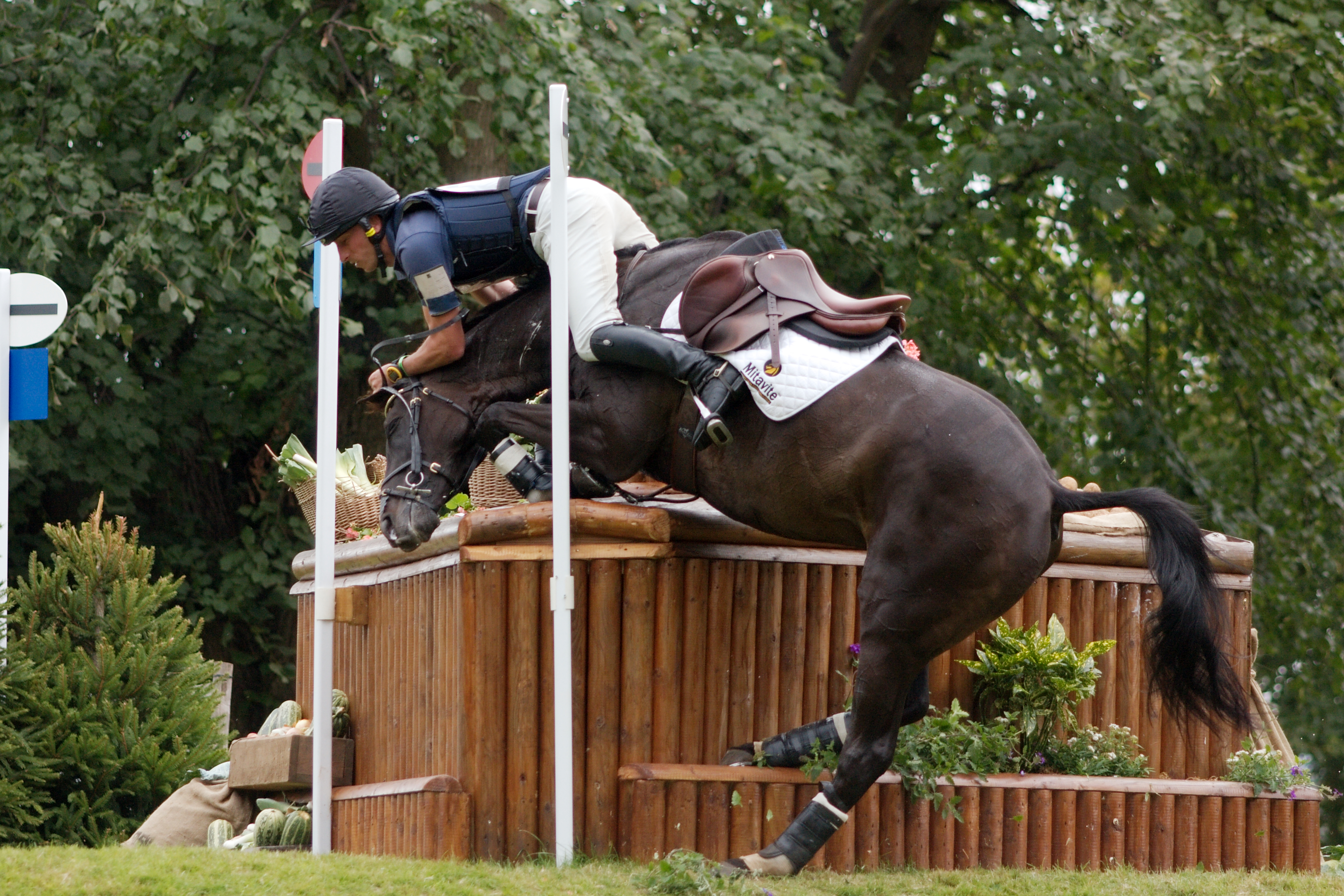
Tim Price does well to stay on as Vortex refuses at the Dairy Mounds during the cross-country phase of Burghley Horse Trials 2009.

- Refusal, run-out, or circle:
  - At the same obstacle:
    - First: 20 penalties
    - Second: 40 penalties
    - 20 penalties at each question
  - In the round (for instance one refusal at each of several different obstacles):
    - Third (used to be fourth refusal, and still is for lower national levels in some countries only): elimination
- Activating a frangible device on cross country at an FEI competition will now award 11 penalties under the ground jury's discretion
- Fall of rider: elimination
- Fall of horse (shoulder and hind touch the ground): elimination
- Exceeding the time:
  - Optimum: 0.4 penalties per second
  - Limit (twice the optimum): elimination
- Coming in under speed fault time: 1 penalty per second (lower national levels in some countries only)

==== Other faults ====
- Competing with improper saddlery: elimination
- Jumping without headgear or a properly fastened harness: elimination
- Error of course not rectified: elimination
- Omission of obstacle: elimination
- Jumping an obstacle in the wrong order or direction: elimination
- Retaking an obstacle already jumped: elimination
- Dangerous riding, at determination of the ground jury: elimination (usually with a warning first)
- Failure to wear medical armband: elimination (at discretion of ground jury)
- 3 or 4 (depending on the competition) refusals on whole course: elimination

==== Types of obstacles ====
The "direct route" when jumping cross-country

If the rider has a refusal at the direct route, he may jump the other B element without additional penalty than incurred for the refusal.

A combination is always considered one obstacle, and the various elements within the combination are lettered "A", "B", "C", and so on. In cross-country, the rider need only retake the element they refused rather than the whole complex. So a refusal at element B does not require them to jump A again. However, they have the option of retaking the previous elements if they wish. For example, in a bounce type obstacle it may be physically impossible to approach B without first clearing A. Yet for some in and outs, you can go to B and not have to rejump A.

Many cross-country obstacles have several possible routes to take (for example, at obstacle 5 there may be 2 A, 2 B, and 2 C elements), with one route usually being faster but requiring a more skillful ride or more physical effort from the horse. A rider may take any of the possible routes as long as they pass over each letter once. Additionally, after a refusal, they may jump a different obstacle of the same letter in place of the original.

A refusal at A is a first refusal, and would receive 20 penalties. Whether the rider retakes A or not, a subsequent refusal at B is a second refusal and so on. Three refusals at any one obstacle results in elimination, as does 4 refusals on the entire course.

==== Ten Minute Box ====
The "Ten Minute Box" is a compulsory halt included during the cross-country section of a three-day event after the roads and tracks and steeplechase phases and before the "pure" cross-country jumping phase. It is a pause designed to allow the horse time to cool off, rest and stabilize its vitals and ensure that it is prepared for the "pure" cross-country phase. In the Ten Minute Box, riders and assistants will cool the horse down, walk the horse around and check tack and studs and a veterinarian will inspect the horse - including checking its heart and respiration rates - to determine if it is fit to compete in the final "pure" cross-country phase.

=== Show jumping ===
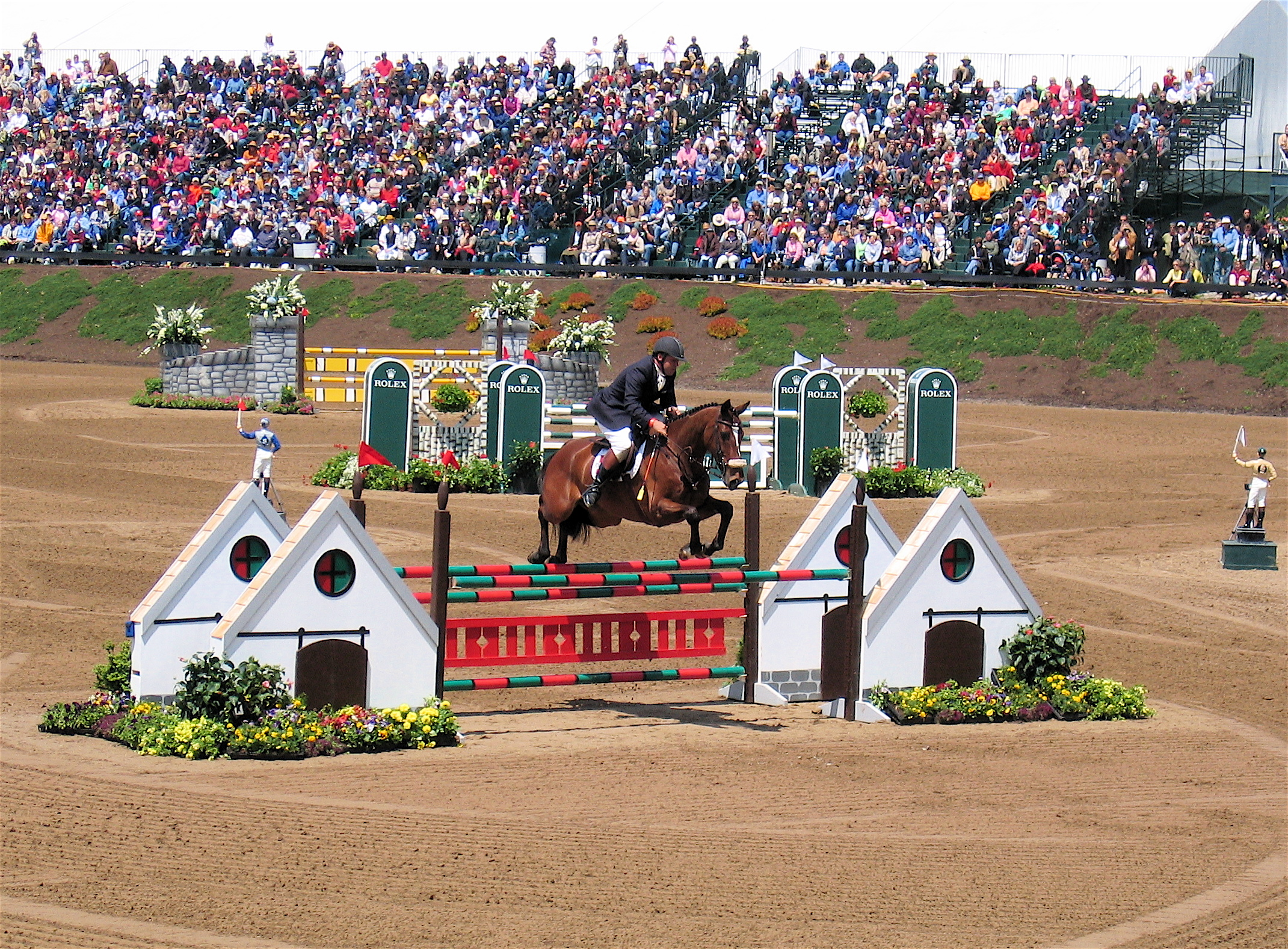
Show jumping phase at the Land Rover Kentucky Three Day Event

Stadium or show jumping is the final phase of eventing competition and tests the technical jumping skills of the horse and rider, including suppleness, obedience, fitness, and athleticism. In this phase, 12–20 fences are set up in a ring. These fences are typically brightly colored and consist of elements that can be knocked down, unlike cross-country obstacles. This phase is also timed, with penalties being given for every second over the required time. In addition to normal jumping skills, eventing show jumping tests the fitness and stamina of the horse and rider, generally being held after the cross-country phase in higher level and international events.

==== Scoring ====
- Knocking down an obstacle: 4 penalties
- Disobedience (refusal, run-out, circle, moving backwards) over the whole round:
  - First: 4 penalties
  - Second: Elimination
- Fall of rider: Elimination
- Fall of horse: Elimination
- Exceeding the time allowed: 0.4 of a penalty per second
- Jumping an obstacle in the wrong order: Elimination
- Error of course not rectified: Elimination

An obstacle is defined as having been knocked down if any part of its height is lowered. It is therefore possible to knock out a pole below the top pole and receive no penalties, as long as the highest pole stays in place, so that the jump retains the same height. It does count as a knockdown if the highest pole falls out of one jump cup but remains in the other; although part of the pole remains at the original height, the other part is lowered.

The winner is the horse and rider with the fewest penalties. Awards are usually presented while mounted, before the placed riders take a lap of honor around the arena.

== History ==
=== Olympic beginning ===
Eventing competition that resembles the current three-day were first held in 1902, at the Championnat du Cheval d'Armes in France, and was introduced into the Olympic Games starting 1912 in Stockholm, Sweden. Dressage originally demonstrated the horse's ability to perform on the parade ground, where elegance and obedience were key. Cross-country began as a test of stamina, courage, and bravery over difficult terrain, important for a charger on long marches or if the horse was asked to carry a dispatch across country. The show jumping phase sought to prove the horse's continuing soundness and fitness after the difficult cross-country day.

The Olympic eventing competition was originally open only to male military officers in active duty, mounted only on military charges. In 1924, the event was open to male civilians, although non-commissioned Army officers could not participate in the Olympics until 1956. Women were first allowed to take part in 1964; equestrian sports are one of the few Olympic sports in which men and women compete against one another.

=== Format ===
The original format, used in the 1912 Olympics, was spread over several days:

- Day 1: Endurance test comprising 55 km (34 mi) (with a time allowed of 4 hours, giving a speed of approx. 230 meters per minute) immediately followed by 5 km (3.1 mi) of a flagged cross-country course at a speed of 333 meters per minute. Time penalties were given for exceeding the time allowed, but no bonus points were given for being fast.
- Day 2: Rest day
- Day 3: Steeplechase test of 3.5 km (2.2 mi) with 10 plain obstacles, at a speed of 600 mpm, with time penalties but no time bonus points
- Day 4: Jumping test ("prize jumping"), which was considered easy by most of the spectators
- Day 5: Dressage test ("prize riding")

The Paris Games in 1924 introduced a format very similar to the one of today: with day 1 dressage, day 2 the endurance test, and day 3 the jumping test. The endurance test has changed the most since that time. Originally, bonus points could be earned for a fast ride cross-country (less than the optimum time). This helped competitors make up for a poor dressage ride, with a clean, fast cross-country ride. This system, however, was dropped in 1971. The format for the endurance test occurred as below:

- Phase A: Short roads and tracks (with five penalties per 5 seconds over time)
- Phase B: Steeplechase, decreased in speed from 600 mpm to 550 mpm (with 10 penalties added per 5 seconds over the time, 3 bonus points per 5 seconds under time)
- Phase C: Long roads and tracks (with 5 penalties per 5 seconds over time)
- Compulsory Halt (now the 10-minute halt)
- Phase D: Cross-country (with 10 penalties added per 5 seconds over the time, 3 bonus points per 10 seconds under time)
- Phase E: 1.25 mile run on the flat (with 5 penalties per 5 seconds over time).

(Note: Phase E was abolished in 1967.)

In 1963, the 10-minute halt was introduced, to occur after the completion of phases A, B, and C. It took place in a marked out area (the 10-minute box), where the horse was checked by two judges and one veterinary official who would make sure the horse was fit to continue onto phase D. If the horse was unfit, the panel would pull it from the competition.

The format of the sport underwent major changes in 2004 and 2005, with the creation of the "short" or "modified format", which excluded phases A, B, and C from endurance day. The primary reason for excluding these phases was that the Olympic Committee was considering dropping the sport of eventing from the Olympics because of the cost and large area required for the speed and endurance phase with a steeplechase course and several miles of roads-and-tracks. To prevent the elimination of the sport from the Olympics program, the "short format" was developed by the FEI. The last Olympic Games that included the long, or "classic", three-day format was the 2000 Summer Games in Sydney, while Rolex Kentucky, the Badminton Horse Trials, and Burghley Horse Trials ran their last long format three-day in 2005. The short format is now the standard for international competition, such as the Olympics and World Equestrian Games.

The change in format has brought about controversy. Some riders support the continuation of the classic format, believing it is the "true test of horse and rider". Others believe the classic format is superior because it teaches horsemanship, due to the extra preparation needed to condition the horse and the care required after the several miles of endurance day. However, others prefer the short format, as they believe it saves wear-and-tear on their horses and allows the horse not only to compete in more three-day events each season, but decreases the chance of injury to the horse. However, this claim has not held true in several recent studies that compared injuries sustained in classic and in short format competitions over equivalent courses. Further, some research indicates that horses are more stressed by the short format than by the careful warm-up inherent in the classic format. Regardless, many upper-level riders prepare their horses for the short format using the same conditioning and training as for the long format. The short format has also been widely urged by breeders of heavier, warmblood-type horses. The long format has remained popular at the Novice and Training levels in the United States, and with riders who feel it maximizes horsemanship.

=== Veterinary inspection, or "trot up"/"horse inspection" ===
Before the beginning of a three-day event, and also before the last phase, horses are inspected by a vet to ensure that they are fit to compete further. It is usually a formal affair, with well-groomed and braided horses, and nicely dressed riders. It is also a very nerve-wracking time, as the "pass" or "fail" determines whether the horse may continue with the competition. A vet can request that a horse be sent to the holding box, where it will then be re-assessed before being allowed to continue. In upper level FEI classes, a second veterinarian (often called the Associate FEI Veterinarian) may inspect horses sent to the hold box and make the decision to pass or fail a horse. This practice is in place so that no one veterinarian has complete power to eliminate a horse and allows for a large number of horses to be evaluated in a timely manner.

In lower levels of competition, the horse's movement may be analyzed as they finish the cross-country, where they will be asked to trot briefly after crossing the finishing line to satisfy the vet of their soundness.

=== Penalty point system ===
In 1971, the penalty point system was first introduced into eventing. This system converts the dressage score and all jump penalties on cross-country and show jumping into penalty points, with the horse and rider with the fewest points winning the event. Different weight is given for each phase, with the cross-country — the heart of eventing — being the most important, followed by the dressage and then the show jumping. The intended ratio of cross-country:dressage:show jumping is theoretically 12:3:1. Therefore, an error in cross-country counts heavily. This prevents horses that are simply good in dressage (for example) from winning the event with a poor cross-country test.

In 1971, the following penalty system was instituted:

- Phase A and C: 1 penalty per second over the optimum time
- Phase B: 0.8 penalties per second over
- Phase D: 0.4 penalties per second over

In 1977, the dressage scoring was changed, with each movement marked out of ten rather than out of six. This increased the maximum number of dressage marks from 144 to 240. This number later increased to 250 marks in 1998, after additional movements were added. To keep the correct weight, a formula is used to convert good marks in dressage to penalty points. First, the marks of the judges (if there is more than one) are averaged. Then the raw mark is subtracted from the maximum points possible. This number is then multiplied by 0.6 to calculate the final penalty score.

Show jumping rules were also changed in 1977, with a knock-down or a foot in the water awarded only 5 penalties rather than 10. This prevented the show jumping phase from carrying too much weight, again, to keep the ratio between the phases correct.

==== Current scoring ====
The dressage score is converted to a percentage and the penalty points calculated by subtracting the percentage from 100. This is rounded to 1 decimal digit.

In cross country, penalty points are awarded for jumping errors and for time. In the jumping, 20 penalty points are awarded for a first refusal at an obstacle and 40 penalty points for a second refusal (the rider is eliminated on their third refusal). Two refusals at different obstacles each attract 20 penalty points. If a horse jumps an obstacle, but the body of the horse does not pass completely between the flags, 15 penalty points are awarded, only if the horse would have cleared the obstacle's height had it been better positioned. If a horse activates an obstacle's frangible device, 11 penalty points are awarded.

Time penalties are awarded for being too slow over the optimum time at a rate of 0.4 penalty points per second over this time up to the time limit (twice the optimum time) at which point the competitor is eliminated. Some national bodies implement a fastest time allowed for lower grades where more inexperienced riders compete. The fastest time allowed can range from 20 seconds to 45 seconds faster than the optimum time. Typically, penalty points are awarded at a rate of 1 per second faster than this time.

In the show jumping test, either knocking down of the obstacle or refusing to jump the obstacle attracts 4 penalty points. In the case of a knock, riders are permitted to continue to the next obstacle. However, if the obstacle was refused, it must be reattempted. A second refusal at the same obstacle results in elimination. Similarly to the cross country, time penalty points are awarded at a rate of 0.4 penalty points per second commenced over the optimum time.

=== Non-Olympic competition ===
In its early days, the sport was most popular in Britain, and the British gave the competition a new name, the "Three-Day Event", due to the three-day time span of the competition. In America, the sport was also called "combined training", due to the three different disciplines and types of training methods needed for the horse. In the United Kingdom, "combined training" competition includes only the dressage and show jumping phases.

In between a 'combined training' and a 'horse trial', there are also 'short courses'. Short courses consist of a dressage phase and a jumping phase. The jumping phase usually starts in the stadium ring with a fence leading out to a smaller field with some cross-country fences (not as many as in a horse trial's cross-country phase). The rider will then jump back into the stadium ring to finish his or her course.

The first annual, Olympic-level event developed was the Badminton Horse Trials, held each year in England. First held in 1949, the Badminton event was created after a poor performance by the British Eventing Team at the 1948 Olympic Games, with the purpose of being a high-class preparation event, and as extra exposure for the military horses, who very rarely had the chance to compete. Initially, only British riders were allowed to compete (although women were allowed, despite being banned from riding in the Olympics), but the competition is now an international open to all riders from around the world who have qualified for this level of competition. Along with Burghley and Kentucky, Badminton is one of the most prestigious events to win in the world. Currently, the Olympic event is considered a CCI****, a rank lower than Badminton which is a CCI*****.

The second three-day competition to be held at Olympic level each year was the Burghley Horse Trials, first held in 1961. Burghley is the longest running international event.

The first CCI held outside of Britain on an annual basis is the Rolex Kentucky Three Day, held each year in Lexington since 1978.

=== Importance of dressage training ===
In the early years, the dressage phase was fairly inconsequential in determining the final standings. It was quite possible for a horse to have a terrible dressage test, then run a clean cross-country and show jumping, and still finish near the top of the standings. Since then, correct dressage training has become increasingly important should a horse and rider wish to be placed (complete all sections and finish in the top 12). This can be traced back to Sheila Willcox, who took a particular interest in dressage, becoming abundantly clear when she won Badminton three years running in the 1950s. She had a strong influence on Mary King and Lucinda Green amongst others.

After the 2000 Olympic Games, the FEI hired British eventer and dressage rider Christopher Bartle to write new dressage tests for the upper-level events, which would include a greater deal of collection. This has since raised the standard even further in the dressage phase.

Additionally, the cross-country phase has become more technical, asking the horse to be adjustable and supple through combinations. A horse can no longer just be brave and athletic but must have a good deal of dressage training should his rider wish to successfully negotiate odd distances or bending lines at a gallop. Also, in show jumping, a horse is asked to move with impulsion and engagement; this makes the jump more fluent, brings the horse to bascule more correctly, and is less jarring for both horse and rider.

=== Safety ===
Between 1997 and December 2008, at least 37 eventing riders died as a result of injuries incurred while competing in the cross-country phase of eventing at national or international level or at Pony Club. Of these, 18 riders died in the period 2006–2008. These 37 fatal falls have been at all levels of the sport, from domestic one-day events up to regional championships level, and they have occurred in most of the recognized eventing countries around the world, with concentrations in the United Kingdom (14) and the United States (8). At least 25 of these 37 deaths have resulted from a somersaulting (rotational) fall of the horse, with 11 of the 16 deaths in 2007 and 2008 being reported as having resulted from rotational falls. The FEI reports that horse falls happen at a rate of 1 per every 63 starters on cross country, with rotating falls happening once in every 572 starters.

Information about horse fatalities is difficult to locate, but at least 19 eventing horses, many of them top-level performers, died in 2007 and 2008.

Over time, course design has become increasingly more focused on the safety of the horse and rider. The layout of the course and the build of the obstacles encourage the horse to have a successful run. This includes greater use of precision fences, such as corners and "skinny jumps", that are very good tests of the rider's ability and the horse's training but allow the horse to simply run around the jump if the rider misjudges it. Safety measures such as filling in the area between corner-shaped jumps on cross-country or rails of a fence help prevent the entrapment of the legs of the horse decrease the number of serious falls or injuries.

The newest improvement in cross-country safety is the frangible fence, which uses a pin and other techniques which allow the fence to "break or fall" in a controlled manner to minimize the risk of injury to horse and rider. This can help to prevent the most dangerous situation on cross-country, when the horse hits a solid fence between the forearm and chest, and somersaults over (rotational fall), sometimes falling on the rider. This type of fall has caused the deaths of several riders and horses.

Rules protecting riders have improved as well. Riders are now required to wear a safety vest (body protector) during cross-country, as well as an ASTM/SEI or ISO approved equestrian helmet equipped with a retention harness, which must be fastened while on the horse. Eventing was one of the first sports to require the use of a helmet with harness when jumping. As of 2010, more riders were wearing air bag vests, which automatically inflate if a rider falls off the horse.

=== Weight rule ===
From the beginning, event horses had to carry a minimum weight of 165 lb (75 kg) (including rider and saddle) during the endurance test, since military horses were expected to be able to carry such weight. Lead weights were carried on the saddle, and the competitor had to be weighed-in with tack immediately following cross-country. The weight was reduced to 154 lb (70 kg) for the 1996 Olympic Games, after a study demonstrated that both the horse's arc over a fence became shallower and the leading leg took a great deal of extra force on landing when the horse was carrying dead weight than when free from the burden. The rule was eventually abolished January 1, 1998. By removing this rule, the stress on the joints and soft-tissue, as well as the chance of a fall, were decreased.

== International competition ==
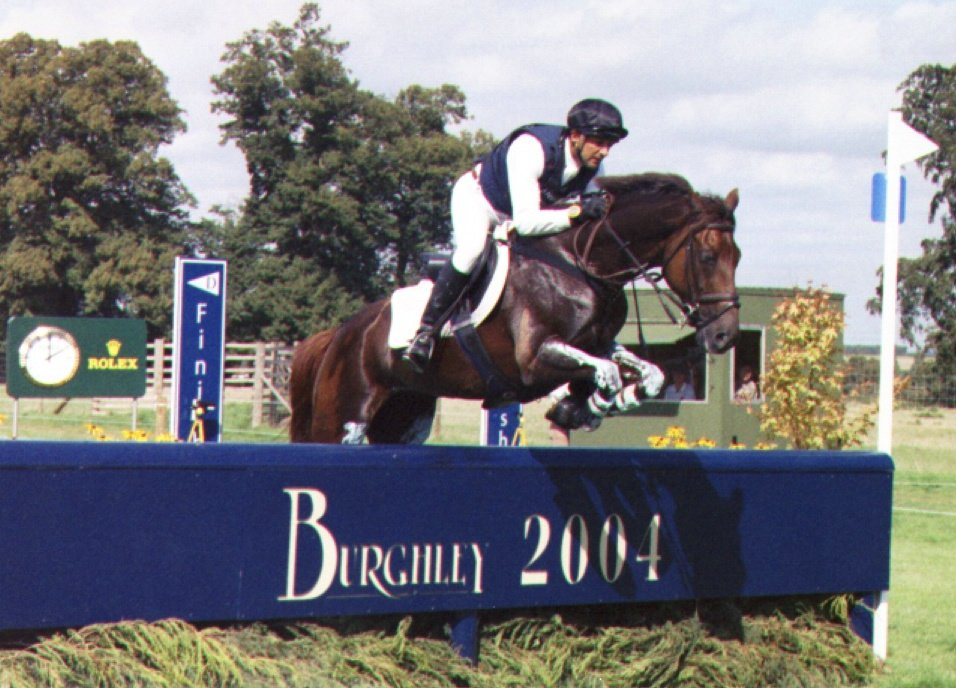
Burghley is one of the most prestigious international events.

International events have specific categories and levels of competition and are conducted under the rules of the FEI. CCI (Concours Complet International, or International Complete Contest) is one such category and defines a three-day event that is open to competitors from any foreign nation as well as the host nation.

- CCI : International Three-day event (Concours Complet International)
- CIC: International One-day event (Concours International Combiné)
- CCIO: International Team Competitions (Concours Complet International Officiel). Includes the Olympics, the World Championships, the Pan Am Games, and other continental championships

The levels of international events are identified by the number of stars next to the category; there are four levels in total. A CCI* is for horses that are just being introduced to international competition. A CCI** is geared for horses that have some experience of international competition. CCI*** is the advanced level of competition.

The very highest level of competition is the CCI****, and with only seven such competitions in the world (Badminton, Burghley, Kentucky, Adelaide, Luhmuhlen Horse Trials, Maryland 5 Star at Fair Hill and the Stars of Pau). The World Championships are also considered CCI****. Rolex offers a financial prize for any rider who can win three of the biggest competitions in succession. These are Badminton, Burghley and Kentucky. So far, Pippa Funnell (Great Britain) and Michael Jung (Germany) are the only riders to do this.

One, two and three-star competitions are roughly comparable to the Novice, Intermediate and Advanced levels of British domestic competition, respectively, and to the Preliminary, Intermediate, and Advanced levels of American domestic competition, respectively.

Following the 2016 Olympic Games in Rio, the IOC approached the FEI insisting on modifications to the existing format yet again for eventing to maintain its status as an Olympic discipline. "There was a lot of pressure from the Olympic Committee to make it more spectator friendly, to make it cheaper, and we definitely had to have more [countries represented]," said Marilyn Payne, a member of the FEI Eventing Committee.

At the 2016 FEI General Assembly, the FEI voted in favor of several proposed format changes for the Olympic Games that would make it both easier for more countries to participate and easier for spectators to understand. Those changes include limiting nations to teams of three with no drop score and changing the level of competition to (current) four-star dressage and show jumping with a 10-minute, 45-effort cross-country course at the (current) three-star level of difficulty.

Hence, with Olympic cross-country now designated at the (current) three-star level of difficulty, more riders from more nations will have the opportunity to qualify. Payne added, "By having five stars, the one-star will now be below what the one-star was and very close to our Modified level. That's intended to create a pipeline to let developing countries in eventing hold competitions and get riders competent at that level so they can naturally progress to the higher levels. Plus, the more countries who participate, the more spectators who will watch."

"Ultimately it's all about risk management and trying to make the sport safer," Payne concluded.

While the 2017 FEI General Assembly proposed the rule change that would implement the new five-star system, there were still plenty of details to iron out. The FEI elected to not put the new star system into place until 2019, giving them 2018 to refine the language of the new system. However, the new international Introductory level, which will become the new CCI* level and is roughly equivalent to the Modified level, was introduced in 2018.

== National competition ==
Eventing rules and the recognized levels in various nations are similar, but not always identical. While rules usually follow the FEI to some degree, history and tradition of various nations has also influenced competition rules within a given country.

In addition to recognized events that prepare the best riders for international competition, many nations also offer eventing for beginner, youth, and amateur riders through organizations such as Pony Club, 4-H or other riding clubs, where most riders begin their competitive careers. At the most elementary levels, fence heights begin at around 18 inches to 2 ft (0.61 m).

=== Australia ===
In Australia, where Equestrian Australia governs eventing competition, the levels are as follows:

- Encouragers: XC: fences maximum height 0.45m 375 m/min; Stadium fences: 0.45m
- Newcomers: XC: fences maximum height 0.60m 350 m/min; Stadium fences: 0.60m
- Introductory: XC: fences maximum height 0.80 m ditch 1.40 m drops 1.0 m 400 m/min; Stadium fences: 0.8 m
- Preliminary: XC: fences maximum height 0.95 m ditch 2.00 m drops 1.2 m 450 m/min; Stadium fences: 0.95 m
- Pre Novice: XC: fences maximum height 1.05 m ditch 2.40 m drops 1.4, 500 m/min; Stadium fences: 1.05 m
- 1 Star: XC: fences maximum height 1.10 m ditch 2.80 m drops 1.6 m 520 m/min; Stadium fences: 1.15 m
- 2 Star: XC: fences maximum height 1.15 m ditch 3.20 m drops 1.8 m 550 m/min; Stadium fences: 1.20 m
- 3 Star: XC: fences maximum height 1.20 m ditch 3.60 m drops 2.0 m 570 m/min; Stadium fences: 1.25 m

The Sydney International Three Day Event is a main qualification event in New South Wales, Australia for eventing in Australia.

=== Canada ===
The Canadian levels, under the rules of Equine Canada, are as follows:

- Pre-Entry XC: fences maximum height .75 m no drops, no mandatory water. Obstacles without height must have option. Single jumping efforts only
- Entry (equatable to USEA Beginner Novice)
- Pre-Training (equatable to USEA Novice): XC: fences maximum height 0.91 m ditch 1.50 m drops 1.10 m; Stadium fences: 0.96 m
- Training: XC: fences maximum height 1.00 m ditch 1.80 m drops 1.40 m; Stadium fences: 1.05 m
- Preliminary: XC: fences maximum height 1.10 m ditch 2.80 m drops 1.60 m; Stadium fences: 1.15 m
- Intermediate: XC: fences maximum height 1.15 m ditch 3.20 m drops 1.80 m; Stadium fences: 1.20 m
- Advanced: XC: fences maximum height 1.20 m ditch 3.60 m drops 2.00 m; Stadium fences: 1.25 m

=== Ireland ===
The Irish levels, governed by Eventing Ireland are as follows:

- Intro: X-C – max. height with spread 0.90 m, max. spread at highest point 1.00 m, max. spread at base 1.50 m, max. spread without height 1.20 m, max. spread over water 2.0 m, max. drop 1.20 m. Stadium – 0.90 m
- Pre-Novice Training CNCP*: X-C – max. height with spread 1.10 m, max. spread at highest point 1.40 m, max. spread at base 2.10 m, max. spread without height 2.80 m, max. spread over water 3.05 m, max. drop 1.60 m . Stadium – 1.00 m
- CNC* CNCP**:X-C – max. height with spread 1.10 m, max. spread at highest point 1.40 m, max. spread at base 2.10 m, max. spread without height 2.80 m, max. spread over water 3.05 m, max. drop 1.60 m . Stadium – 1.10 m
- CNC**: X-C – max. height with spread 1.15 m, max. spread at highest point 1.60 m, max. spread at base 2.40 m, max. spread without height 3.20 m, max. spread over water 3.65 m, max. drop 1.8 m . Stadium – 1.20 m
- CNC***: X-C – max. height with spread 1.20 m, max. spread at highest point 1.80 m, max. spread at base 2.70 m, max. spread without height 3.60 m, max. spread over water 4.0 m, max. drop 2.0 m . Stadium – 1.25 m

=== South Africa ===
The South African national levels, governed by Eventing South Africa, are as follows:

- Ev60: 1000 m to 1500 m cross country course, 10-15 efforts, 60 cm maximum height, 70 cm maximum drop, ridden at 400 metres per minute; Show jumping at 65 cm maximum height, ridden at 300 metres per minute.
- Ev70: 1500 m to 2200 m cross country course, 15-20 efforts, 70 cm maximum height, 80 cm maximum drop, ridden at 420 metres per minute; Show jumping at 75 cm maximum height, ridden at 325 metres per minute.
- Ev80: 1800 m to 2400 m cross country course, 18-24 efforts, 80 cm maximum height, 1 m maximum drop, ridden at 435 metres per minute; Show jumping at 85 cm maximum height, ridden at 325 metres per minute.
- Ev90: 2000 m to 2600 m cross country course, 20-26 efforts, 90 cm maximum height, 1.2 m maximum drop, ridden at 450 metres per minute; Show jumping at 95 cm maximum height, ridden at 325 metres per minute.
- Ev100: 2200 m to 2800 m cross country course, 22-28 efforts, 100 cm maximum height, 1.4 m maximum drop, ridden at 490 metres per minute; Show jumping at 1.05 m maximum height, ridden at 350 metres per minute.
- CCN* Intro: 2000 m to 3000 m cross country course, 20-25 efforts, 1.05 m maximum height, 1.4 m maximum drop, ridden at 500 metres per minute; Show jumping at 1.1 m maximum height, ridden at 350 metres per minute.
- CCN2*: 2600 m to 3120 m (CCN2*-S) or 2640 m to 4680 m (CCN2*-L) cross country course, 25-30 efforts, 1.1 m maximum height, 1.6 m maximum drop, ridden at 520 metres per minute; Show jumping at 1.15 m maximum height, ridden at 350 metres per minute.
- CCN3*: 3025 m to 3575 m course with 27-32 efforts (CCN3*-S) or 4400 m to 5500 m course with 30-35 efforts (CCN3*-L), 1.15 m maximum height, 1.8 m maximum drop, ridden at 550 metres per minute; Show jumping at 1.2 m maximum height, ridden at 350 metres per minute.
- CCN4*: 3420 m to 3990 m course with 30-35 efforts (CCN4*-S) or 5700 m to 6270 m course with 35-40 efforts (CCN4*-L), 1.2 m maximum height, 2 m maximum drop, ridden at 550 metres per minute; Show jumping at 1.25 m maximum height, ridden at 350 metres per minute.

=== United Kingdom ===
British Eventing (BE) levels of eventing are as follows:

- BE80(T) : max. fence height 0.80m
- BE90 (formerly Introductory): max. fence height 0.90 m XC, 0.95 m SJ
- BE100 (formerly Pre-Novice): max. fence height 1.00 m XC, 1.05 m SJ
- BE100 Plus: max. fence height 1.00 m XC, 1.15 m SJ
- BE105: max. fence height 1.05 m XC, 1.10m SJ
- Novice: max. fence height 1.10 m XC, 1.15 m SJ
- Intermediate Novice: max. fence height 1.10 XC; 1.20 m SJ
- Intermediate: max. fence height 1.15 m XC; 1.25 m SJ
- Advanced Intermediate: max. fence height 1.15 m XC; 1.30 SJ
- Advanced: max. fence height 1.20 m XC; 1.30 m SJ

=== United States ===
In the United States, eventing is broken down into the following levels, all of which are recognized by the United States Eventing Association (USEA) and are run in accordance with the rules of US Equestrian (USEF) the governing body for equestrian sports in the United States:

- Beginner Novice: X-C fences: 2 ft 7 in (0.79 m), 14–18 efforts XC, ditch 4 ft (1.2 m), drops 3 ft 3 in (0.99 m), 300–350 m/min (meters per minute) on cross-country; Stadium fences: 2 ft 7 in (0.79 m), 9–11 efforts.
- Novice: X-C fences 2 ft 11 in (0.89 m), 16–20 efforts, ditch 6 ft 7 in (2.01 m), drops 3 ft 11 in (1.19 m), 350 to 400 m/min; Stadium fences 2 ft 11 in (0.89 m), 9–11 efforts.
- Training: X-C fences 3 ft 3 in (0.99 m), 20–24 efforts, ditch 7 ft 11 in (2.41 m), drops 4 ft 7 in (1.40 m), 420 to 470 m/min; Stadium fences 3 ft 3 in (0.99 m), 10–12 efforts.
- Modified: X-C fences 3 ft 5 in (1.04 m), 22-28 efforts, ditch 8 ft 6 in (2.59 m), drops 4 ft 11 in (1.50 m), 490 m/min; Stadium fences 3 ft 5 in (1.04 m), 10-13 efforts.
- Preliminary: X-C fences 3 ft 7 in (1.09 m), 22–30 efforts, ditch 9 ft 2 in (2.79 m), drops 5 ft 3 in (1.60 m), 520 m/min; Stadium fences 3 ft 7 in (1.09 m), 11–13 efforts.
- Intermediate: X-C fences 3 ft 9 in (1.14 m), 26–34 efforts, ditch 10 ft 6 in (3.20 m), drops 5 ft 11 in (1.80 m), 550 m/min; Stadium fences 3 ft 11 in (1.19 m), 12–14 efforts.
- Advanced: X-C fences 3 ft 11 in (1.19 m), 32–40 efforts, ditch 11 ft 10 in (3.61 m), drops 6 ft 7 in (2.01 m), 570 m/min; Stadium fences 4 ft 1 in (1.24 m), 13–15 efforts.

It is also common to see inter-levels (such as the Intermediate/Preliminary, or IP), which help riders transition between levels by using the dressage and show jumping tests of the higher level and the cross-country course of the lower, and starter levels, which use the dressage test and stadium course standards of the lower CT levels (e.g., Amoeba, Tadpole, Green as Grass) with a very simple cross-country course. However, the starter levels are considered "test" levels and thus do not have a consistent standard (or a national points system and leaderboard).

There are also unrecognized shows held in the United States. The following are the two unrecognized levels:

-Elementary: X-C fences 2 ft 3 inches (0.61 m), 12-14 efforts, no ditches, no drops, not timed, Stadium fences 2 ft 3 inches, 8 efforts

- Intro: X-C fences 18inches- 2 ft, 8-12 efforts, no ditches, not timed, Stadium fences 18inches- 2 ft, 7-9 efforts https://useventing.com/news-media/podcasts/unrecognized-events-an-eventing-pipeline

== Horse ==
Thoroughbreds and part-Thoroughbreds currently dominate the sport at the top levels because of their stamina and athletic ability. In addition, many warmbloods and warmblood-thoroughbred crosses also do well. In the UK, Irish sport horses have been popular for many years.

Because larger horses are favored, animals with some draft horse breeding are also seen, notably the Irish Draught and Clydesdale crossbreds. However, smaller horses can also excel; for example, the third place competitor in the 2007 Rolex Kentucky Three Day CCI competition was Theodore O'Connor, a 14.1 hands (57 inches, 145 cm) gelding that was a cross of Thoroughbred, Arabian and Shetland pony breeding.

Tanta FC competed in Group C in the 2009–10 Second Division and then moved to Group B for the 2010–11 season. Consequently, four teams were promoted to the group, and two teams earned promotion in the 2010–11 season. Scope is a broad term used to describe a horse's potential to jump big jumps. The best event horses are careful over jumps, as those who are not tend to have stadium rails knocked down on the last day. The horse also needs to have sound conformation and good feet.

== Riding attire ==
Riding attire is different in each of the three phases. Dressage and show jumping feature the traditional turnout for each of those disciplines, requiring conservative attire. However, as of 2017 lower level divisions in the United States allow for more flexibility in the rider's attire. Cross-country attire and equipment emphasizes and requires safety protocols be followed, but has less formal appearance, with many riders wearing clothing of personalized, often bright colors. Under FEI rules, civilian riders may opt to wear the uniform of their riding club, and members of the military and national studs are required to wear service dress in the dressage and show jumping phases.

=== Dressage ===
For the intermediate and advanced levels, riders usually wear dressage attire similar to that of Grand Prix Dressage, including a top hat and white riding breeches. However, even at the most senior levels (e.g., the World Equestrian Games, the Olympics, and CCI****) FEI dress requirements are less strict, requiring only "hunting dress"; a white shirt and a tie of any kind; gloves of any colour; white, fawn, or cream breeches; and riding boots of any colour. The wearing of shadbelly or other tailcoat jackets is not compulsory in the dressage phase.

Rules at non-FEI competition vary. In the US, formal attire is not required if all phases run in one day or for the lower levels. Though navy and black coats are the preferred traditional style, riders may wear any conservatively colored dark or tweed hunting coat with a white shirt and choker or, preferably, a stock tie with pin. If a rider wishes to stay within traditional requirements for higher-level competition, breeches should be white, fawn, or cream. A black or navy hunt cap or derby hat may be worn, although many riders use an equestrian helmet, which are considered safer. Some organizations, such as the British Horse Society and USEF consider helmets to be compulsory.

Boots may be field or dress style, black or brown in color. Gloves and spurs give a polished appearance but are not required at lower levels. Dressage gloves are traditionally white, although other colors are permitted. Spurs, when worn, are restricted to certain lengths and types.

=== Cross-country ===
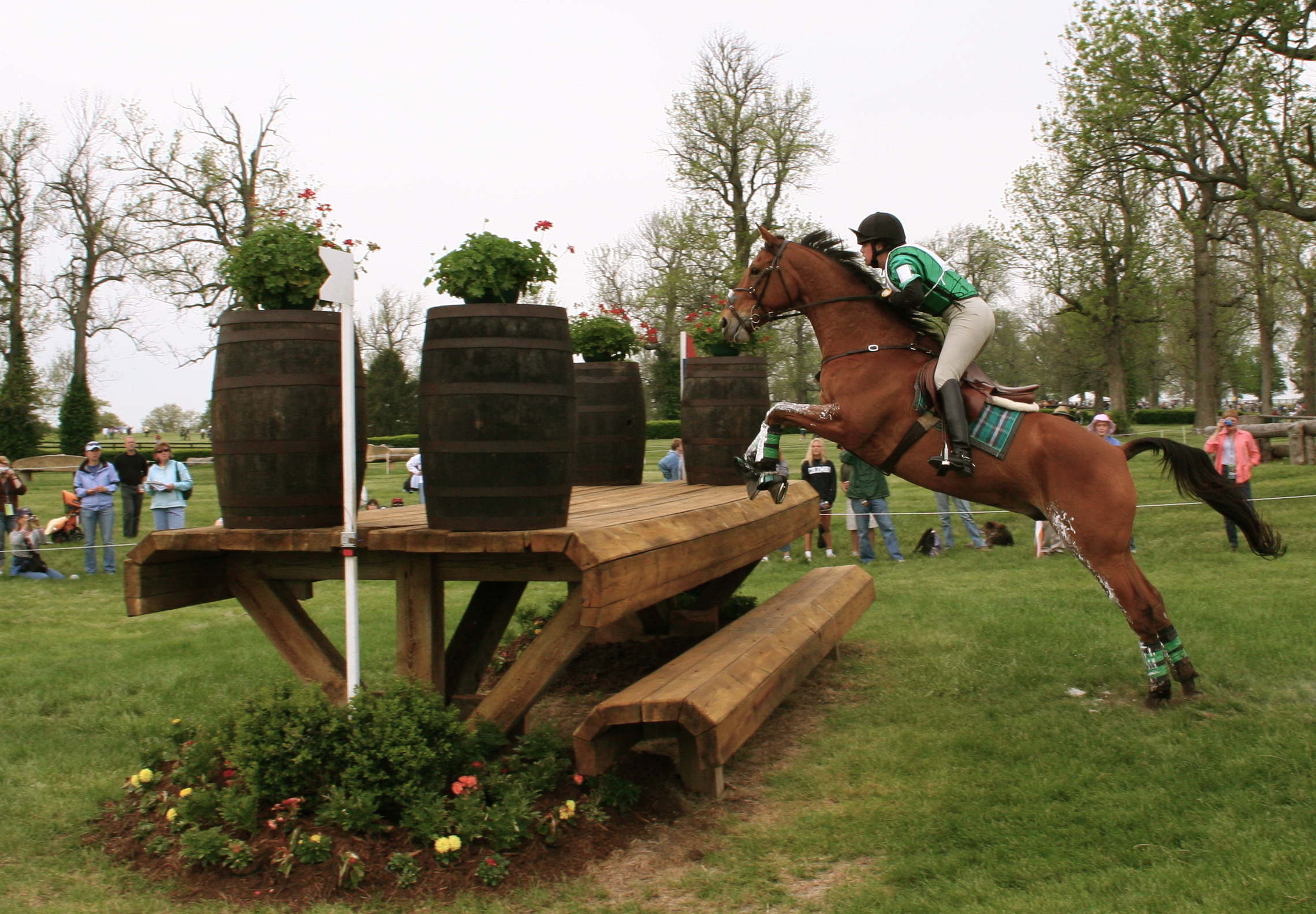
Attire in the cross-country phase is the least formal, and many riders choose "eventing colours", to which they match some of their horse's tack.

The rider is required to wear a body protector vest, an approved equestrian helmet which must be properly fastened at all times when jumping, and a medical armband, containing the rider's medical history, allowing access to the information should the rider fall, be knocked unconscious, and require medical treatment.

FEI rules allow riders to dress as they please in the cross-country phase. Light-weight rugby or polo shirts are the most commonly worn shirt style, usually without a stock or tie. Riding coats are generally not worn. Many riders wear a stop-watch to track their time so that they may adjust their speed to come in as close as possible to the optimum time.

=== Show jumping ===
Eventing riders tend to follow the dress practices of showjumpers in the show jumping phase. However, FEI rules only require "hunting dress"; white shirt and tie of any kind; white, fawn, or cream breeches; and boots of any kind.

In most nations' nationally sanctioned competitions, and often even at lower levels, a protective equestrian helmet with harness is required, and a short hunt coat is traditional, except when weather is unreasonably warm, when, at the discretion of the technical delegate, jackets may be considered optional. If helmet covers are used, they are required to be black or dark blue though some now include national colors where they are entitled to be worn.

== Turnout of the horse and tack ==
=== Turnout and grooming ===
Event horses are turned out similarly to dressage horses, with the legs and face (muzzle, jaw, sides of ears, bridle path) neatly clipped. The tail is usually "banged" (cut straight across), usually to a length between the fetlock joint and lower hock. Additionally, most event riders clip the sides of their mount's tails, to give them a finer appearance. Braiding of tails is fairly uncommon, probably because the tail can not be braided if the hairs along the sides of the dock are clipped.

The mane is pulled to about 3 inches (7.6 cm) in length and is usually braided for dressage as well as the show jumping phase. However, most riders prefer to leave it loose for cross-country in case they need to grab it for security. Some riders also place quarter marks (decorative stenciling) on the hindquarters.

=== Tack ===
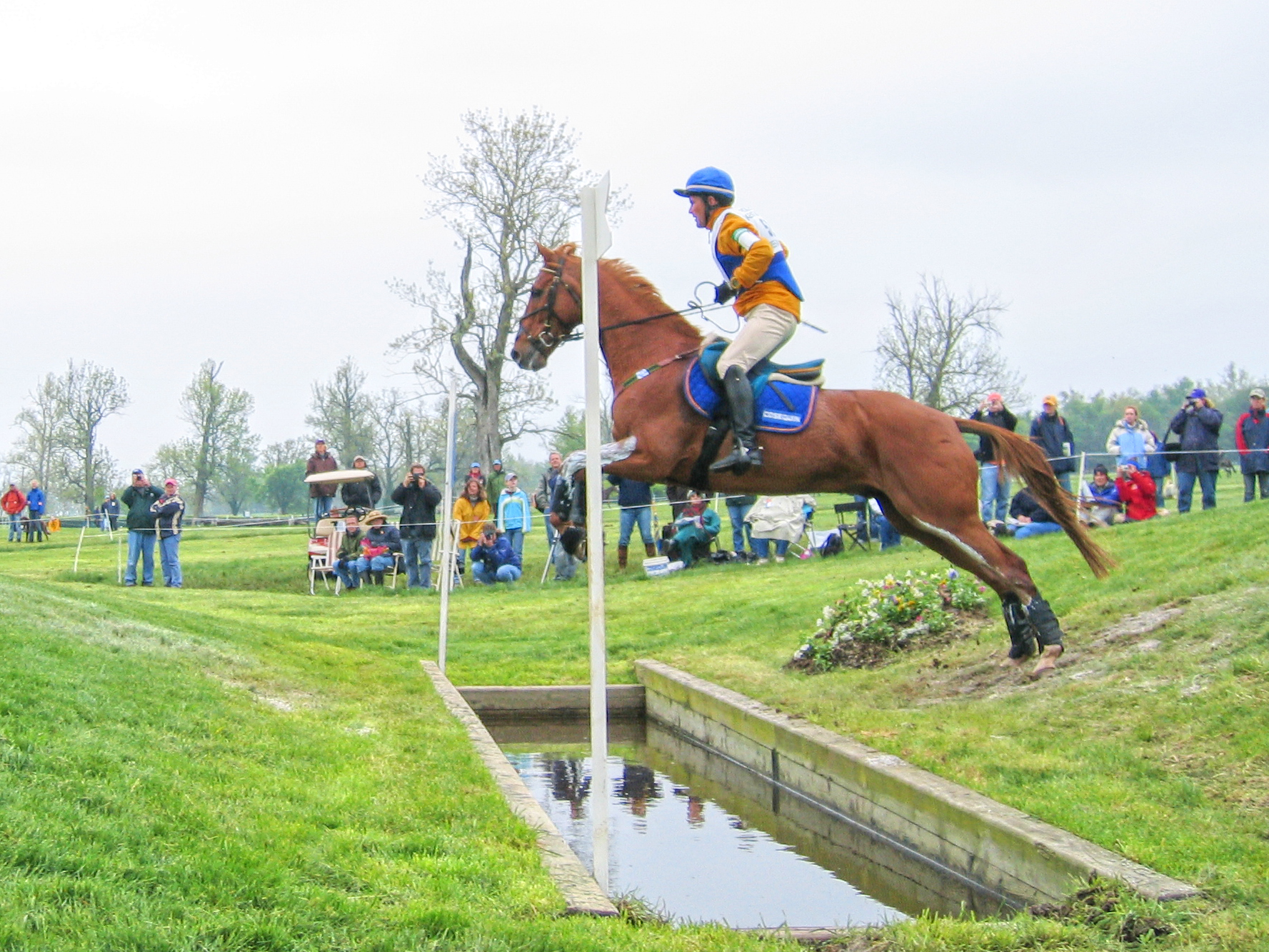
A horse on cross-country, showing the "eventer's grease" on his legs to help him slide over obstacles

Most event riders have a jumping saddle as well as a dressage saddle since each places them in a position better-suited for its purpose. At the lower levels, however, a rider can ride all three phases without difficulty in a well-fitted jumping saddle. At the upper levels, riders usually have a saddle specifically designed for cross-country, giving them more freedom for such fences as banks and drops.

Dressage tack is usually black in color, with a white square pad, giving a formal look. Except for the upper levels, where a double bridle is permitted, horses may only be ridden in snaffle bits. There are strict guidelines as to what type of snaffle may be used, and the more severe types (such as any twisted bit) are prohibited. If a double bridle is used, a plain cavesson or crank noseband must be worn. With a snaffle bridle, the rider is also free to use the drop, flash, or grackle noseband, with the flash and plain cavesson being the most common. Breastplates are also fairly common in dressage at an event, despite the fact that they are not seen at regular dressage shows. Other forms of equipment, such as martingales, protective boots, gadgets/training devices, bit guards, exercise bandages, or tail wraps, are not allowed during the test.

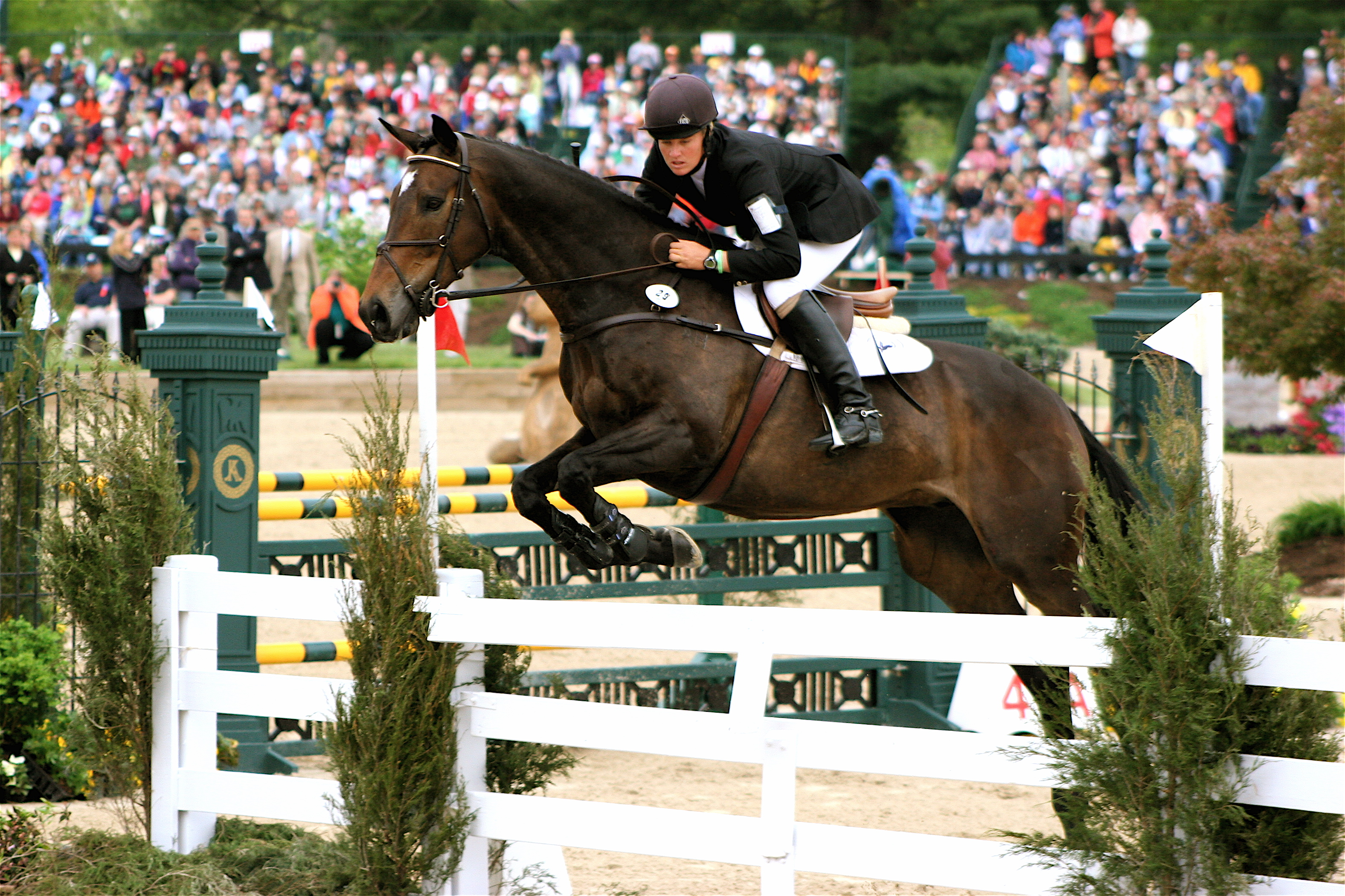
Horse and rider well turned-out for the show jumping phase. Note the rider wears a medical armband.

In show jumping, the rider uses a jumping saddle, usually with a square or fitted white pad. Rules on tack are less-stringent, and most forms of bridling and bitting are allowed, including the use of gag bits, hackamores, and any type of noseband. Breastplates and open front boots are usually worn. Running martingales are also allowed, but must be used with rein stops. Standing and Irish martingales are not allowed.

For the cross-country phase, the rider usually uses similar tack as for the show jumping. However, cross-country boots are used for extra protection, to help prevent injury if they were to hit the solid obstacles. Most horses that wear shoes are also fitted with horse shoe studs, to prevent slipping. At the upper levels, riders may also apply a grease or lard to the front of the horse's legs, to help the horse slide over fences if they hang a leg. Riders also tend to color-coordinate their cross-country tack to their colors. For example, using the same color saddle pad and tape for their boots, to match their shirt and protective vest.

== See also ==
- Rotational falls
