= Leg-yield =

Action in dressage

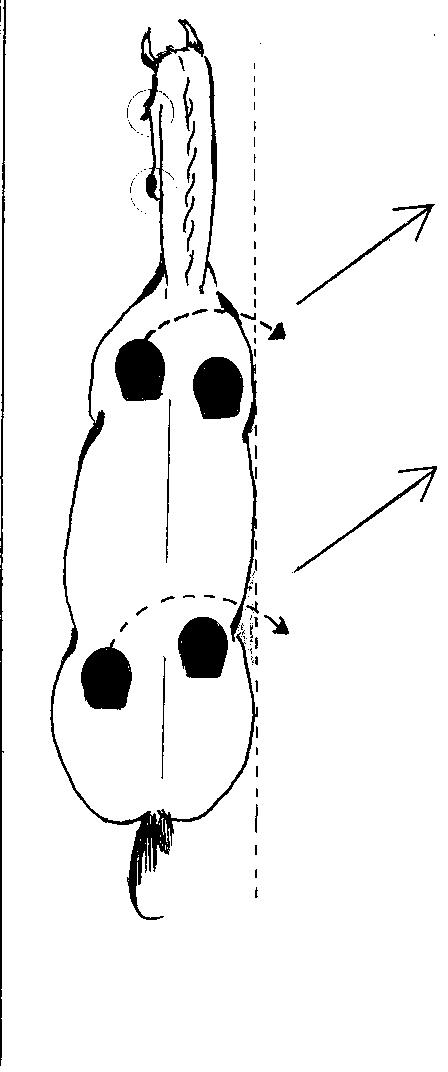
In the leg yield, the horse is looking away from the direction of travel, with the spine straight, the inner nostril and eye just visible, and the inner legs crossing in front of the outer legs.

The leg-yield is a lateral movement in which a horse travels both forward and sideways at the same time. The horse is fairly straight through his body in the leg-yield, although he may have a slight bend opposite to the direction of travel. It is one of the "three initial movements leading up to true lateral work", the others being the turn on the forehand and the shoulder-fore.

== Difference from the half-pass ==
The leg-yield and half-pass are sometimes confused because they are both movements in which the horse goes forward and sideways. However, the half-pass is quite a bit more advanced, requiring greater balance, engagement, and collection from the horse. In the leg-yield, the horse is fairly straight or bent slightly away from the direction of travel. In the half-pass, the horse is bent towards the direction of travel, which is physically much more difficult for the horse.

== Uses and disadvantages ==
The leg-yield is one of the first lateral exercises to be introduced to a horse, teaching it a simple yet valuable lesson: to move sideways away from leg pressure. This basic is later built upon in the shoulder-in and haunches-in.

Some trainers do not believe that the leg-yield is a particularly useful exercise after this concept has been taught, falling short when compared to such exercises as the shoulder-in. However, in modern dressage training it is generally held that the leg-yield is a valuable tool for suppling a stiff horse, straightening a crooked horse, and preparing a lower-level horse for more advanced work. The leg-yield is a required movement in the First Level dressage test.

Another use of the leg-yield is in the rider's training, as it is a fairly basic move yet can begin to teach the rider how to use the riding aids independently and bring the horse properly into the outside rein and leg.

Improper execution of the leg-yield can have a negative effect on a horse's training, causing loss of forwardness, resulting in short, broken gaits. The Spanish Riding School uses this exercise sparingly, and only at the walk, when first teaching the horse to move away from the leg. Because the horse will be bent in the opposite direction learning the more difficult half-pass, it is believed to be counterproductive to spend much time on the leg-yield. However, when used judiciously and correctly, the leg-yield is a beneficial exercise.

== Different ways to leg-yield ==
The most common place the leg-yield is performed is from quarter line to rail, keeping the horse's body parallel to the wall. With more advanced horses, leg-yielding can be performed back to the quarterline.

The second way the leg-yield is commonly performed is with the horse's nose facing the rail, with its body at no more than a 30-degree angle to the wall. The horse may also be leg-yielded with haunches to the wall. Unlike shoulder- or haunches-in, the horse does not have the same degree of bend. These are not' the same movements. The horse may also be leg-yielded on a diagonal, keeping his body straight.

The last form of leg-yielding is much more advanced, and is not commonly practised. In this movement, the horse is leg-yielded on a volte, with his nose facing the center of the circle.

== Sources ==
- Richard Davison, Dressage Priority Points, Howell Book House, New York 1995
- Jennie Loriston-Clarke, The Complete Guide to Dressage. How to Achieve Perfect Harmony between You and Your Horse. Principal Movements in Step-by-step Sequences Demonstrated by a World Medallist, Quarto Publishing plc, London 1987, reprinted 1993
