= Volte (dressage) =

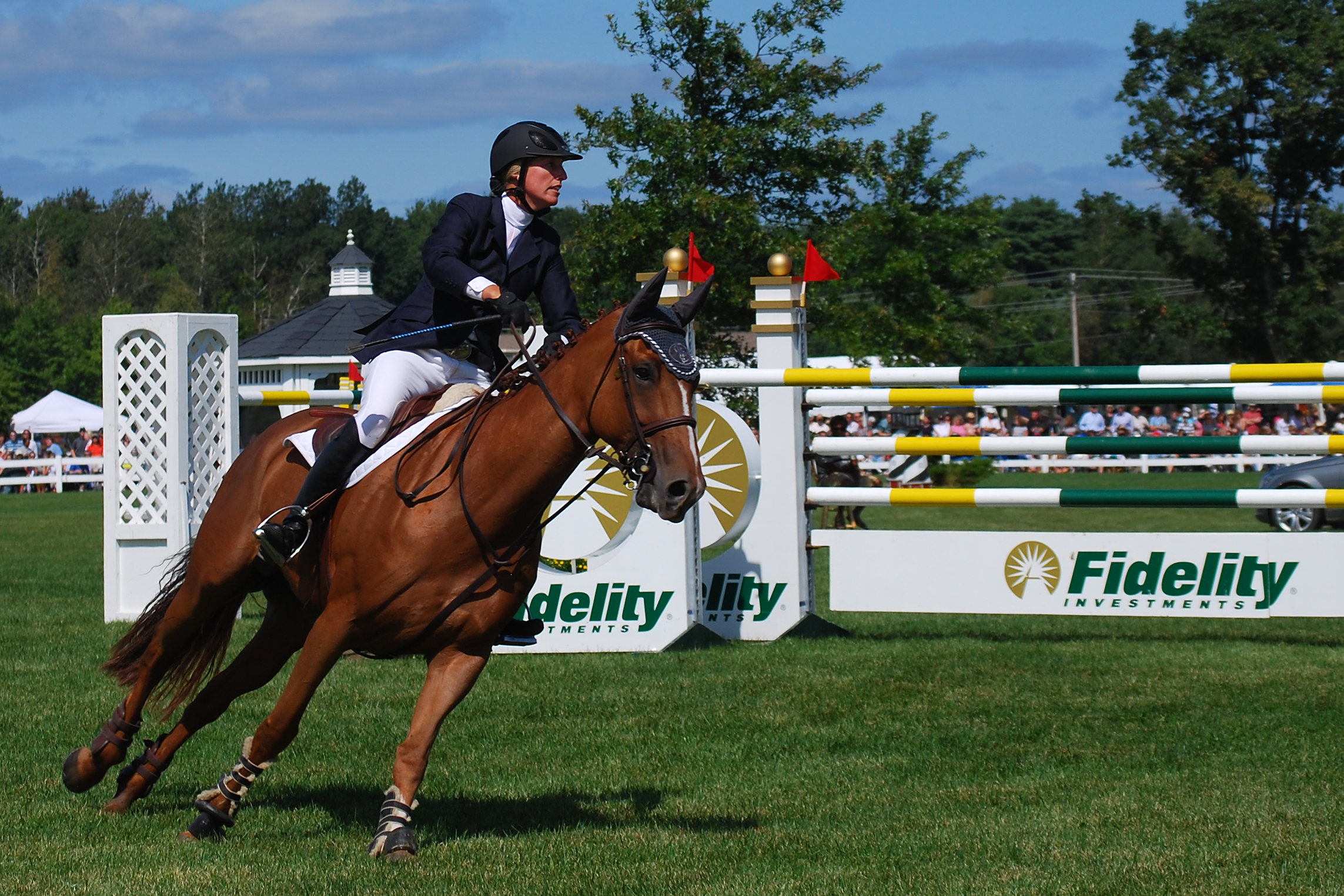
A rider performing a volte

The volte is a very small circle that is used in the training of a horse. Of all the circles, it requires the most balance from the horse. Voltes are excellent training tools, encouraging engagement and power.

== Size ==
The size of a volte will vary between horses, based on their stride length and their training. The accepted diameter for the volte, when used in dressage competition, is 6 meters. However, a horse should not be pressed to perform a smaller circle than is comfortable for him, as it will sacrifice balance, relaxation, and impulsion. These qualities always take precedence over the size of the volte.

== History ==
The volte was traditionally 12 strides long (using the inside hind leg) in circumference, resulting in a circle 10–15 meters in diameter. However, this was later decreased to 6–8 strides in circumference.

First developed by Saunier, leg-yields are sometimes incorporated into voltes, with the horse's nose facing the inside of the circle. Additionally, de la Guérinière developed "square voltes", which are not commonly practiced today.

Riders may incorporate renvers into their volte, as well as use the volte to help prepare the horse for other movements, such as half-pass.
