= German Equestrian Federation =

German Equestrian Federation Deutsche Reiterliche Vereinigung
- Sport: Equestrian
- Jurisdiction: Germany
- Founded: 1905
- Affiliation: FEI
- Affiliation date: 1947
- Headquarters: Warendorf
- President: Martin Richenhagen
- Secretary: Soenke Lauterbach

Official website
- www.pferdesport-deutschland.de

The German Equestrian Federation (Deutsche Reiterliche Vereinigung) is an umbrella organization in Germany for equestrian sports and breeding. It is the governing body for the majority of equestrian sports and their organization in Germany, including FEI-recognized disciplines of dressage, eventing, show jumping, vaulting, endurance, reining, para-equestrian, and driving. It also develops and enforces the rules for other events at horse shows. It is colloquially known as FN, short for the international term Fédération Équestre Nationale. The organisation runs the FNverlag, a publishing house for related books and other media

== Description ==
The organization dates back to 1905, when an association of German half-blood breeders (Halbblutzüchter) was founded in Berlin. Its headquarters moved to Warendorf. It currently governs 17 regional equestrian associations with 7,600 Reit- und Fahrvereine (riding and driving clubs), 55,600 personal members, and 4,000 Pferdebetriebe (equestrian centers). It is a member of the Fédération Equestre Internationale and of the Deutscher Olympischer Sportbund. It is affiliated with the international organisation since 1927.

The popularity of equestrian sports in Germany is reflected in the number of competition licences issued by the FN. In 2013, it issued 90,000 annual licences to confirm eligibility for competition events, 142,000 updated licences for competition horses, and 2,000 new passports for horses competing on the international circuit.

The FN organises equestrian sports, both in tournaments as for hobby riders, and matters of horse care and horse breeding. It is responsible for the education and counseling of its members. Further fields include veterinary medicine, advocacy of equine sports people, related legal matters, and environment protection. The FN promotes the status of the horse as a cultural achievement (Kulturgut Pferd). The organisation runs the FNverlag, a publishing house for related books and other media around its themes, including the rules governing education and exams (APO), those for tournaments, Leistungsprüfungsordnung (LPO), and for breeding (ZVO).
