= Haunches-in =

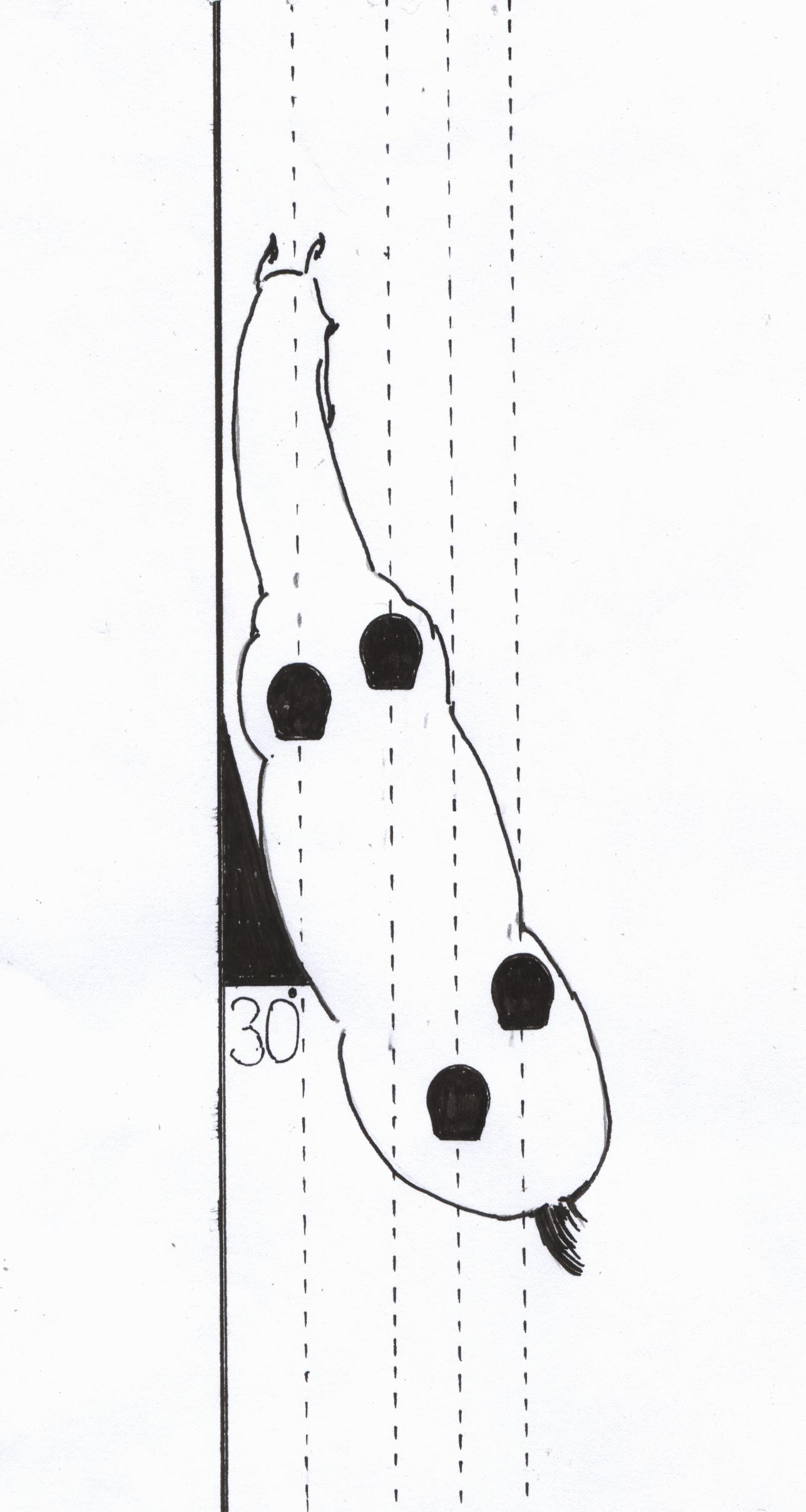
Travers: The horse is moving on four tracks, at an angle of 30°, the neck parallel to the rail, with the poll slightly bent to the inside, so that the eyebrow can be seen.

Haunches-in, also called travers or tête au mur ("head to the wall" in French), is a lateral movement used in the dressage discipline of horse training. It has a close cousin, haunches-out, renvers, or croupe au mur ("rump to the wall"), that is slightly more difficult. Both movements are four-track, meaning they produce four lines of hoof prints in the sand, as opposed to the usual two seen if the horse is straight and to the three-track shoulder-in.

In haunches-in, the horse bends its hindquarters slightly to the inside of the arena, away from the arena wall, so that the horse is bent in the direction of movement. The front legs and shoulders should not move from the original track. This produces the four tracks, with the outer track made by the outside foreleg, the second track by the inside foreleg, the third track by the outside hind leg, and the inside track made by the inside hind leg.

In haunches-out (renvers), the horse is similarly bent in the direction of movement, but the hindquarters are bent toward the arena wall instead of away from it. This produces a four-track movement consisting of the outside track made by the outside hind leg, the second track by the inside hind leg, the third track by the outside foreleg and the inside track by the inside foreleg. This movement is considered to be more difficult than travers.

A horse that naturally moves with its haunches slightly to the inside is simply travelling crooked, and is not performing haunches-in. These horses usually lack correct bend through the whole body, do not work properly into their outside aids, and do not show the same engagement or balance seen in horses ridden in a true haunches-in.

== Uses of travers and renvers ==
Both movements are used in dressage training, as they encourage collection from the horse, help to produce impulsion, can be used to supple the horse and make him more responsive to the aids, and help to strengthen the hindquarters.

Additionally, travers is a stepping stone to the more advanced half-pass, and goes together with the turn on the haunches, which also asks the horse to move in the direction of bend.

Renvers (haunches-out) is a good exercise to counteract the tendency of many horses to travel crookedly. It is employed by the Spanish Riding School, due to their belief that travers encourages the horse to travel crookedly with their haunches leaning toward the center of the arena. Renvers therefore provides all the benefits of travers, without any of the drawbacks.

== Riding the Travers and Renvers ==
When first introducing the movement, the rider begins with haunches-in, as it is slightly easier. It is generally helpful to have begun other simple lateral movements, such as the leg-yield to teach the horse the concept of moving away from the leg, advancing to the shoulder-in to introduce the three-track movement.

It is generally easier to perform the haunches-in if the horse first performs a 10-meter circle before moving into the movement, as the small circle gets the horse correctly bent to the degree needed for haunches-in. The rider should perform slightly less than one full circle, so that the forehand returns to the track while the hindquarters are still slightly to the inside, before asking the horse to move down the long side of the arena.

Like all lateral movements, it is best to begin with a few steps of haunches-in when first teaching it, asking for quality rather than quantity. Additionally, the rider should ask for only a slight bend to the inside, before increasing the degree of bend (and thus difficulty) as the horse progresses. After performing the movement, the horse should be asked to move straight ahead and forward.

To ask for the haunches in, the rider uses the outside leg to guide the horse's hindquarters from the track, and the rider's hips and upper body mirrors the axis of the horse's hips and shoulders. The rider's outside leg is used behind the neutral position to controls the outside hind leg of the horse, keeping it inward from the track and under the horse's body. This both encourages and requires collection and impulsion in this movement. The rider's outside rein maintains the connection, preventing the horse from swinging the shoulders to the outside and straightening its spine, maintaining the energy produced by the horse's outside hind leg. The rider's inside leg asks the horse to bend in the direction of movement and to maintain forward motion and rhythm. The inside rein used to keep the horse looking in the direction of travel and maintain bend.

Renvers is slightly more difficult because the arena wall is not in a position to guide the horse's shoulders and requires the horse to be consistently and correctly on the aids. The movement quickly identifies a rider who uses the wall as a crutch. When moving along the wall of the arena, the horse's shoulders move toward the inside and the horse remains bent in the direction of movement. Renvers may be asked for through a pessade (small half-circle), to help position the horse properly. It may also be asked after going across the diagonal in half-pass, and then positioning the horse once it reaches the arena wall, instead of straightening.

== Sources ==
- Richard Davison, Dressage Priority Points, Howell Book House, New York 1995, ISBN 0-87605-932-9
- Jenny Loriston-Clarke, The Complete Guide to Dressage. How to Achieve Perfect Harmony between You and Your Horse. - Principal Movements in Step-by-step Sequences. Demonstrated by a World Medallist, Quarto Publishing plc, London 1989, Reprinted 1993, ISBN 0-09-174430-X
- Richtlinien für Reiten und Fahren, vol. 2: Ausbildung für Fortgeschrittene, ed. by Deutsche Reiterliche Vereinigung, 12th edition 1997, FNverlag, ISBN 3-88542-283-2
