= Half-pass =

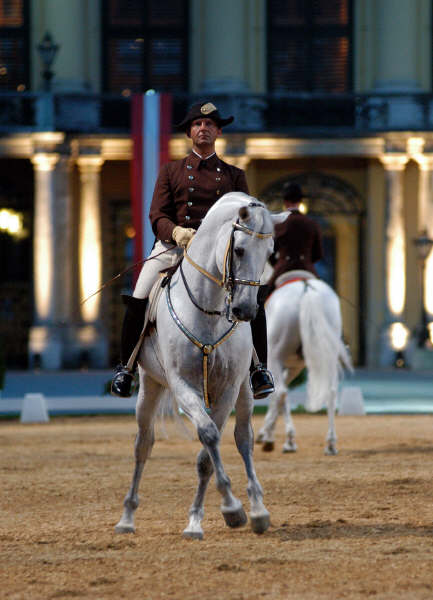
Half pass to the left.

The half-pass is a lateral movement seen in dressage, in which the horse moves forward and sideways at the same time. Unlike the easier leg-yield, the horse is bent in the direction of travel, slightly around the rider's inside leg. The outside hind and forelegs should cross over the inside legs, with the horse's body parallel to the arena wall and his forehand leading. The horse should remain forward, balanced, and bent, moving with cadence. The inside hind leg remains engaged throughout the half-pass, and the horse should not lose its rhythm.

The half-pass is a variation of haunches-in (travers), executed on a diagonal line instead of along the wall. At higher levels it is used to perform a counter-change of hand, combining more than two half-passes with changes of direction in a zig-zag pattern.

== Comparison with the leg-yield ==
The half-pass requires more balance, engagement, and collection from a horse than the leg-yield. This is because the horse is slightly bent in the direction of movement in the half-pass. In the leg-yield, the horse is fairly straight or looking slightly away from the direction of travel.

== Purpose ==
The half-pass is a schooling movement that requires the horse to engage the hindquarters and increase its impulsion, it can therefore be used to improve both collection or impulsion. The half-pass is commonly seen in dressage tests beginning at the United States Dressage Federation third level.

== Performing the maneuver ==
A common method of introducing the half-pass: riding a half 10-meter circle, and half-passing from the centerline back to the rail.

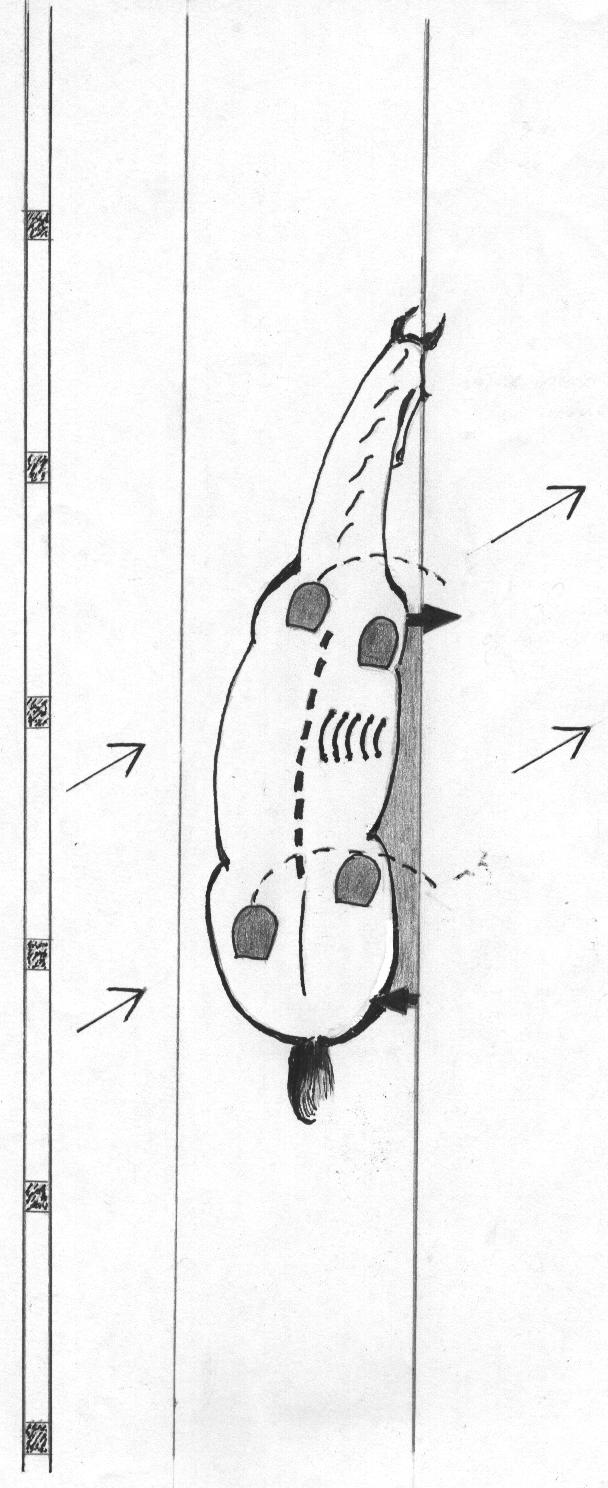
In half-pass the horse is looking into the direction of travel, bent around the rider's inner leg, with the forelegs slightly leading and the outside legs crossing in front of the inside legs.

The half-pass is usually taught after the haunches-in is well confirmed. It may first be introduced by riding a half-10-meter circle from the long side to the centerline, or a half-volte, and then half-passing in. The circle naturally places the horse's body in the correct bend, and helps to encourage the engagement needed for the movement. The outside hind leg must step well under the horse's body to push the animal forward and sideways. A rider uses an active outside leg slightly behind the neutral position to ask the horse to step forward and under. The outside rein maintains the correct bend and contains the energy of the horse, the inside leg keeps the horse moving forward, and the inside rein guides the forehand in the direction of movement. The rider also uses his or her inside seat bone to help maintain bend. If the rider is off-center or twisted, the horse will also be crooked or off-balance.

If the horse loses quality in the movement, such as lack of correct bend (haunches leading or inside shoulder falling inward), loss of rhythm, or stiffness, the rider straightens the horse and rides forward.

The beginning and the end of the movement needs special attention concerning control and balance.

== Sources ==
- Richard Davison, Dressage Priority Points, Howell Book House, New York 1995
- Jennie Loriston-Clarke, The Complete Guide to Dressage. How to Achieve Perfect Harmony between You and Your Horse. Principal Movements in Step-by-step Sequences Demonstrated by a World Medallist, Quarto Publishing plc, London 1987, reprinted 1993
