= Federico Grisone =

Neapolitan riding-master

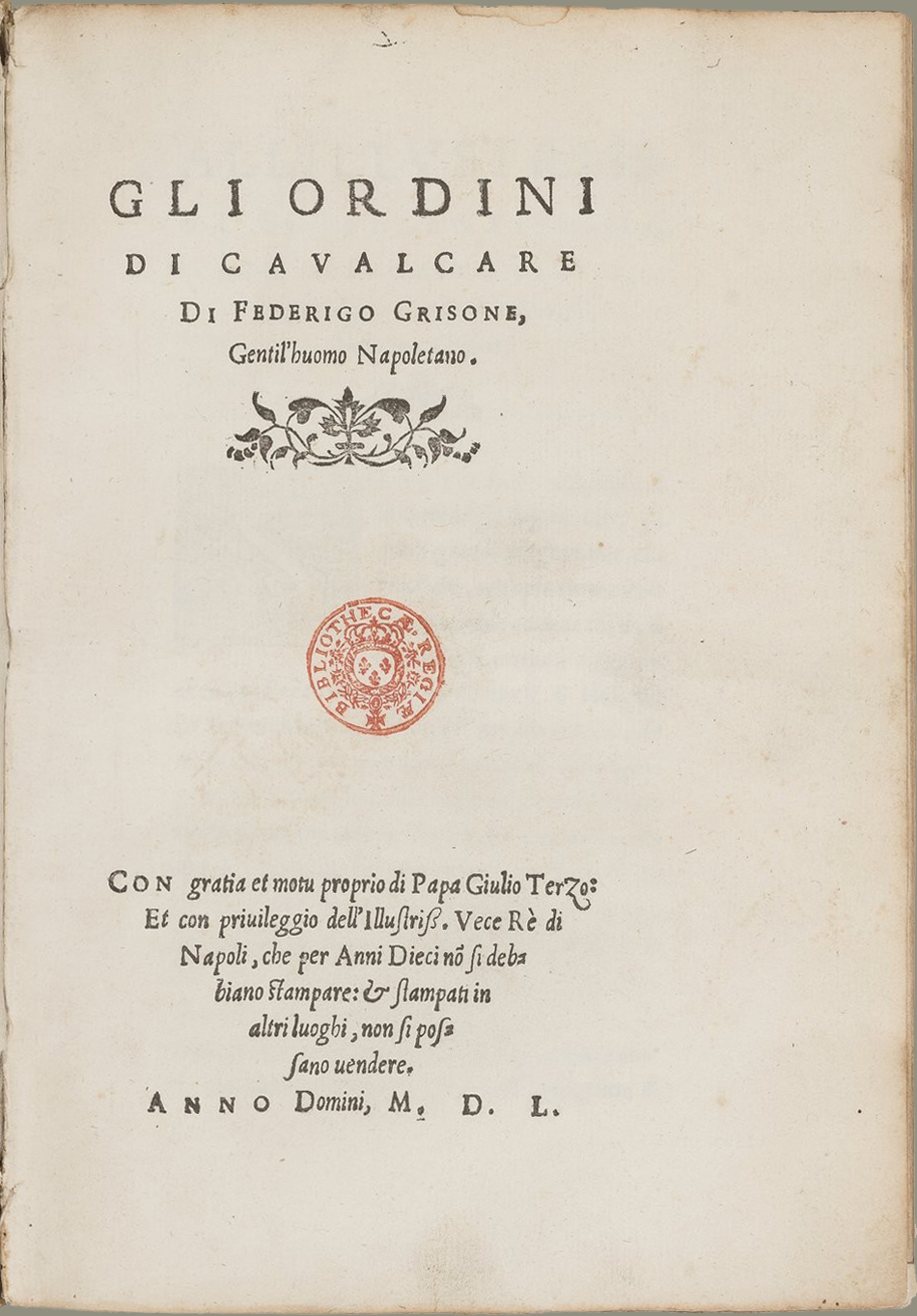
- Title-page of the first edition of Gli ordini di cavalcare, 1550
- Occupation: riding-master
- Writing career
- Language: Italian
- Genre: treatise
- Subject: horsemanship
- Notable work: Gli ordini di cavalcare

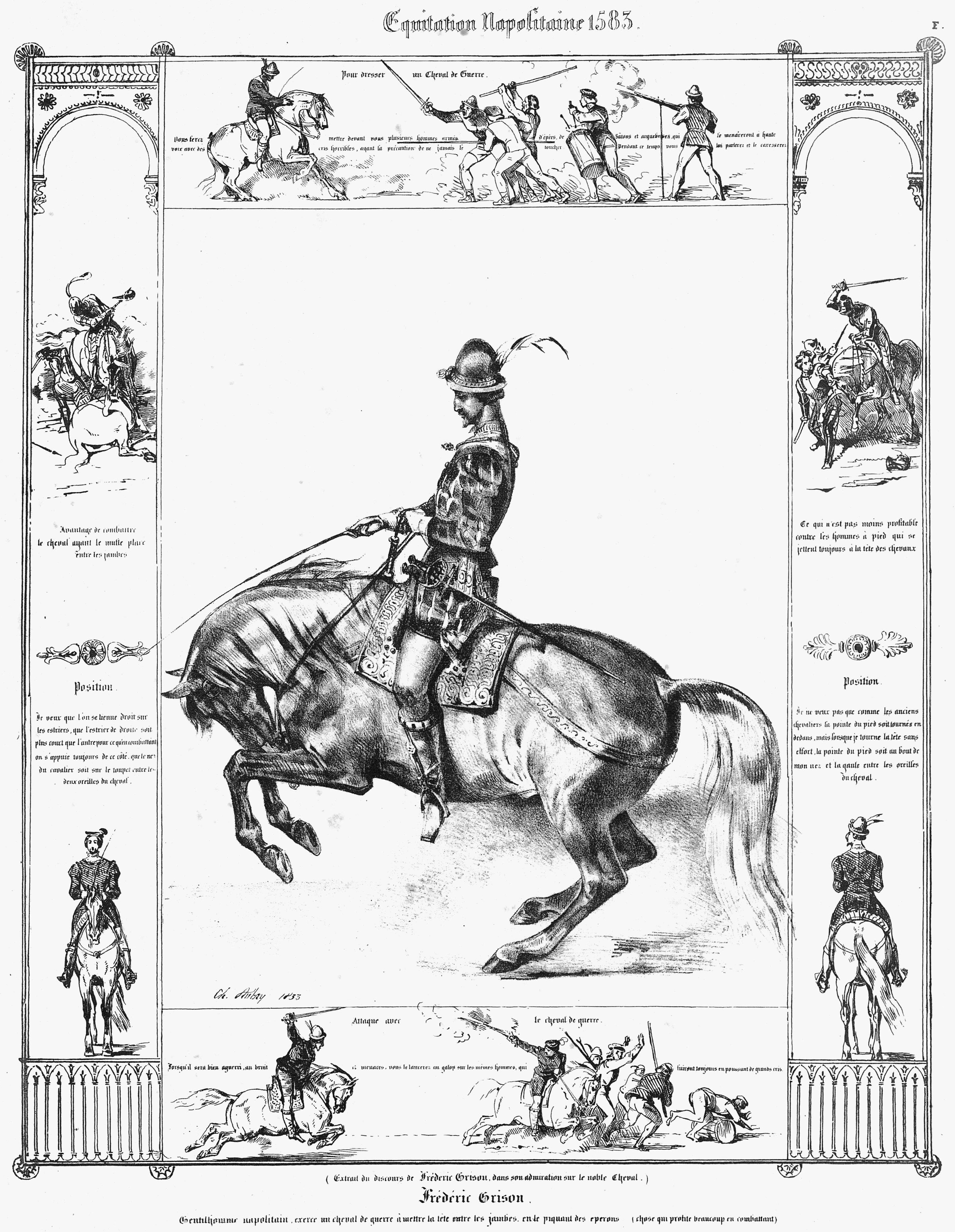
Nineteenth-century lithograph depiction of Grisone, from Charles Aubry (1798–1841), Histoire pittoresque de l'equitation ancienne & moderne, 1833

Federico Grisone was a Neapolitan nobleman and one of the first masters of dressage and courtly riding. Referred to in his time as the "father of the art of equitation", he wrote the first book on this subject to be published in early modern Europe.

== Life ==
Grisone started a riding academy in Naples in 1532, and in 1550 published the influential Gli ordini di cavalcare, "The Rules of Riding", one of the first works on horsemanship since the time of Xenophon. This work was a best-seller of its time. Between 1550 and 1623, twenty-one Italian editions were printed; fifteen translated editions were published in French, seven in German, one in Spanish and six in English. The earliest of these, The arte of ryding and breakinge greate horses, an abridged and adapted translation made by Thomas Blundeville at the suggestion of John Astley and published with plates from the original in 1560, is the earliest book in English on equitation.

Grisone was admired and respected as a great master of his time. Caracciolo wrote of him in 1566:

"From the first it seems that every horse obeys his signal, such that those who watch are amazed."

— Pasquale Caracciolo, La Gloria del Cavallo

His training methods profoundly influenced the training of horses in his day, and were spread into France by Giovanni Battista Pignatelli and his pupils Salomon de la Broue and Antoine de Pluvinel. Today his methods are criticised, particularly outside Italy, for their sometimes harsh treatment of the horse.

== Theories on riding and training ==
Grisone is well known for his rather forceful, sometimes cruel, methods of training. He was influenced by the famous general Xenophon, especially in the positioning of the rider's seat and aids, but he appears to have given up the part where Greek master advocates the gentle training and riding of the horse.

There are several cases in his book "Gli Ordini di Cavalcare," or The Rules of Horsemanship, first published in 1550, where he applies severe practices. He used harsh methods to subdue the horse, using severe spurring and harsh bits (of some of which he was the inventor). Other examples of his cruel methods include placing live hedgehogs under the animal's tail, punishing a horse by placing a cat strapped to a pole under its belly, and forcing the horse's head under water to the point of near-drowning if it showed any fear of crossing water.

Grisone was not an advocate of the now "classical" position that was first suggested by Xenophon, and instead preferred the rider to sit with his feet pushed well forward.

Grisone was considered a master of his time, and his training methods had a great impact on the training of horses of his day. They spread into France, thanks to Salomon de la Broue and Giovanni Battista Pignatelli. However, later masters such as Antoine de Pluvinel, restored the ideas of gentle training of the horse.

== Principal early editions ==
- Gli ordini di cavalcare. Napoli: Giovan Paolo Suganappo, 1550. Also Venice 1551, 1552, 1571; Pesaro 1554, 1555, 1556, 1558.
- François de Lorraine, duc de Guise (translator), L'ecuirie du S. Federic Grison gentilhomme napolitain. En laquelle est monstré l'ordre & l'art de choysir, dompter, piquer, dresser & manier les chevaux, tant pour l'usage de la guerre qu'autre commodité de l'homme. Avec figures de diverses sortes de mors de bride. Nagueres traduitte d'Italien en François. A Paris, chez Charles Perier, à l'enseigne de Bellerophon, rue Sainct Jean de Beauvais 1559. iv, 150pp. Also Paris 1561, 1563, 1575, 1579, 1585, 1610, 1615; Lyon 1584; Tournon 1599.
- Thomas Blundeville (translator), A newe booke, containing the arte of ryding, and breakinge greate Horses, together with the shapes and Figures of many and divers kyndes of Byttes.... London: Willyam Seres, [1560?].
- Johann Fayser den Jüngern von Arnstain (translator), Künstlicher Bericht und allerzierlichste Beschreybung des edeln, uhesten, unnd hochberümbten Ehrn Friderici Grisonis neapolitanischen hochlöblichen Adels: wie de Streitbarn Pferdt (durch welche ritterliche Tugendten mehreers Thails geübet) zum Ernst und ritterlicher Kurtzweil geschiekt und volkommen zumachen. In sechs Bücher bester Ordnung woluerstendlichem Teutsch und zierlichen Figuren (mit Anhengung etzlicher Kampfstuck) dermassen in Druck verfertiget das dergleichen in Teutschland niemals ersehen worden. Augspurg: Getruckt durch M. Manger in Verlegung G. Willers, 1570. Also 1573.
