= Giovanni Battista Pignatelli =

Neapolitan nobleman and riding master

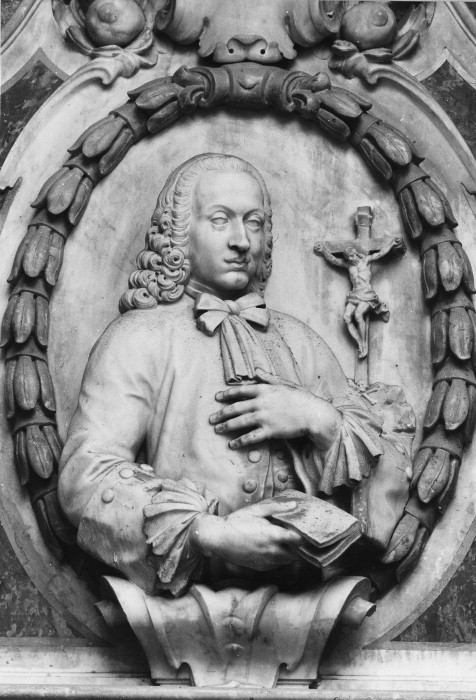
- Bas-relief of Pignatelli on his tomb (Archbishop Pignatelli, 1700s?)
- Born: c. 1525
- Died: before 1600
- Other names: Giovan Battista Pignatelli; Giambattista Pignatelli
- Occupation: Riding instructor

Academic work
- Notable students: Salomon de La Broue; Antoine de Pluvinel
- Notable works: L'Arte Veterale

Giovanni Battista Pignatelli (c. 1525 – before 1600) was a Neapolitan nobleman and riding master. He influenced the development of alta scuola, or classical dressage, both in the Italian peninsula and in France.

== Life and work ==
Pignatelli was born in about 1525, into a Neapolitan noble family originally from Calabria. He was a pupil of Giannetto Conestabile. While some modern sources report him also to have studied under Federico Grisone – also a nobleman of Naples – or Cesare Fiaschi of Ferrara, there is no documentary proof that he did so.

Pignatelli taught in Naples, where gentlemen came from all over Europe to learn the art of riding. His teaching was innovative: he was among the first to teach the style called a la brida, which was not as severe as the traditional Baroque Spanish a la jineta style. Among his pupils were Salomon de La Broue, who spent five years under him, Antoine de Pluvinel, who studied with him for six years, and de Pluvinel's patron the Chevalier de Saint-Antoine.

Pignatelli continued to teach into his old age, but by 1588 his "extreme age" prevented him from doing so. He died before the end of the century.

== Influence and reception ==
Unlike his many of his contemporaries or successors – Grisone, Fiaschi, Pasquale Caracciolo, Claudio Corte, Pirro Antonio Ferraro, Giovanni Paolo d'Aquino, Paolo de' Pavari – who published treatises on various aspects of horsemanship, many of which were soon translated and circulated through much of Europe, Pignatelli never had any work published. A manuscript of his treatise on the veterinary care and treatment of the horse in the Bibliothèque Sainte-Geneviève in Paris was described in 1838. It was divided into three hundred and seventy-six chapters, and included sections on cures for parasites and disease, on bridling and on horse management. A manuscript with the title L'arte veterale is conserved in Verona; a transcription was published in 2001.

Through his influence on de La Broue and de Pluvinel – who became riding-instructor to the king of France and in 1594 started the first riding academy in the country – Pignatelli shaped the development of the art of classical dressage, which diffused through Italy and France, but also to England, to the German-speaking world, to Scandinavia, and eventually to the Iberian peninsula.

In 1576 Prospero d'Osma, who had been a pupil and a collaborator of Pignatelli, was commissioned by Robert Dudley, Earl of Leicester, to prepare a report on the state of Queen Elizabeth's royal stables; d'Osma later opened a riding school in the Mile End district of London.
