= Abraham Holland =

English poet died 1626

- Died: 18 February 1626
- Parent(s): Philemon Holland, Anne Bott

Abraham Holland (died 18 February 1626) was an English poet. He was the son of the translator, Philemon Holland, and the brother of the printer, Henry Holland. His best known work is the Naumachia, a poem on the Battle of Lepanto in 1571.

== Early life and education ==
Abraham Holland was one of the ten children of the translator Philemon Holland and his wife, Anne Bott (1555–1627), the daughter of William Bott (alias Peyton) of Perry Hall, Handsworth, Staffordshire. Holland was a grandson of the Marian exile, John Holland (died 1578), rector of Great Dunmow, Essex. Holland had six brothers and three sisters, including the printer Henry Holland, the print publisher Compton Holland (died 1622), William Holland (1592–1632), a surgeon whose treatise on gout, Gutta Podagrica, was published posthumously in 1633, and Elizabeth Holland, who married a London merchant, William Angell.

Holland was educated like his father at Trinity College, Cambridge, graduating BA in 1617.

== Career ==
Holland's first published work was a Latin elegy on John Harington, 2nd Baron Harington of Exton, who had died on 27 February 1614. The elegy was included in Heroologia Anglica, a two-volume illustrated work in folio printed in 1620 by Holland's brother, Henry Holland.

In 1622 Holland published in quarto a long poem describing the 1571 Battle of Lepanto entitled Naumachia; or, Holland's sea-fight. The volume contained commendatory verses by Michael Drayton, among others, and was dedicated to George Gordon, then Earl of Enzie, son and heir to George Gordon, 1st Marquess of Huntly, and a favourite of King James, who had him educated with his own sons, Prince Henry and Prince Charles. According to Cummings, the poem is written in 'the overblown manner associated with Lucan'.

Another poem by Holland, the satirical A continued just inquisition against paper persecutors, was appended to A Scourge for Paper-Persecutors (1625). The latter was a reprint by Holland's brother, Henry, of John Davies of Hereford's Scourge of Folly of 1611.

== Death and legacy ==
Holland died of the plague on 18 February 1626, perhaps at Chelsea, where he appears to have lived for a time. Following his death his brother Henry published a collection of his poems, entitling it Hollandi Posthuma. Included in it were an elegy on King James, an elegy on Henry de Vere, 18th Earl of Oxford, a lengthy poem on the 1625 plague in London, an epistle to his father, Philemon Holland, who was in ill health at the time, as well as various epistles, translations of the Psalms in verse, and his own epitaph. The collection was described as having been delivered to Henry on the day of Abraham Holland's death.

Some of Holland's poems were reprinted in the years following his death. The Naumachia was reprinted in some copies of the Posthuma, and in some copies of his father Philemon Holland's translation of Xenophon's Cyropaedia printed in 1632. Holland's 1625 poem on the plague from the Posthuma, under a new title, London Looke-Backe, was appended to Salomon's Pest-House or Towre-Royall...By I. D. (1630).

Ashmole MS 36–7 f. 157 contains a poem by Holland addressed 'To my honest father, Mr. Michael Drayton, and my new, yet loved friend, Mr. Will. Browne'.
