= Philemon Holland =

English educator, translator and medic (1552–1637)

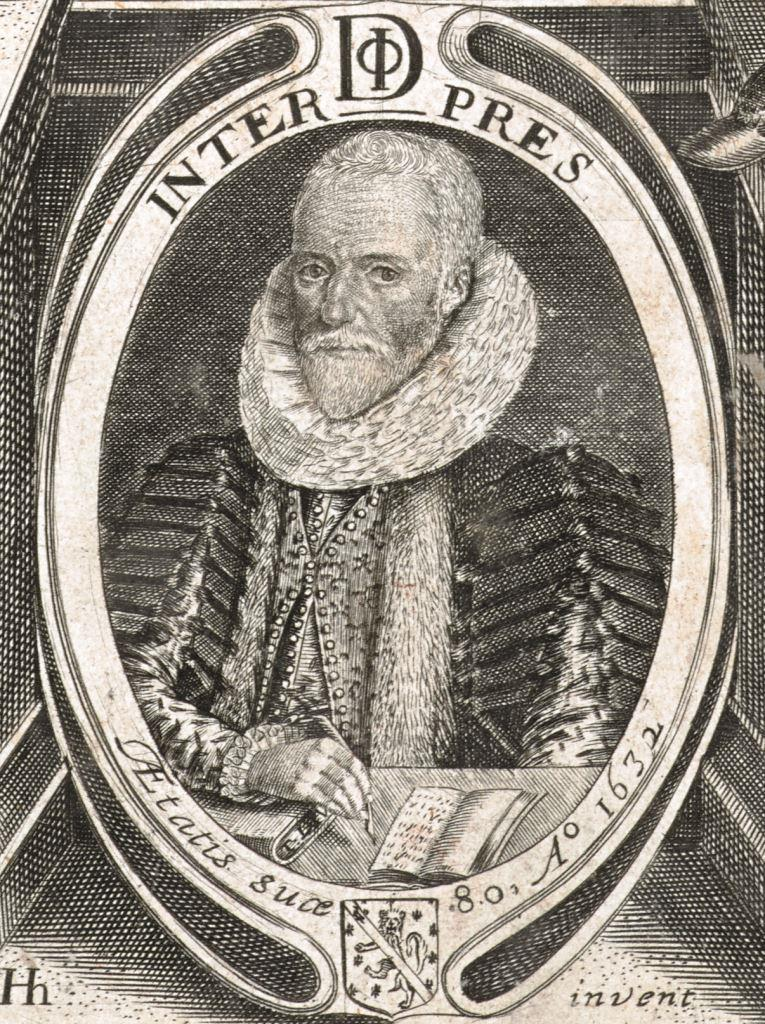
- Philemon Holland, aged 80. An engraving by William Marshall, from a drawing by Henry Holland, Philemon's son, published in Philemon's translation of Xenophon's Cyrupaedia (1632).
- Born: 1552; Chelmsford, Essex
- Died: 9 February 1637 (aged 84–85); Coventry
- Spouse: Anne Bott
- Children: Abraham Holland; Henry Holland; Compton Holland; William Holland six other children including two unmarried daughters
- Parent(s): John Holland, mother's name unknown

Philemon Holland (1552 – 9 February 1637) was an English schoolmaster, physician and translator. He is known for the first English translations of several works by Livy, Pliny the Elder, and Plutarch, and also for translating William Camden's Britannia into English.

== Family ==
Philemon Holland, born at Chelmsford, Essex, in 1552, was the son of John Holland (died 1578), a member of the same Norfolk family as Sir John Holland, 1st Baronet (1603–1701). The Norfolk branch claimed kinship with the Hollands of Up Holland, Lancashire, but this is questionable. Holland's grandfather, Edward Holland, was from Glassthorpe, Northamptonshire. Holland's father, John Holland, was one of the Marian exiles with Miles Coverdale during the reign of Mary I, when Catholicism was re-established. After the accession of Elizabeth I in November 1558, he returned to England, and in 1559 was ordained priest by Bishop Edmund Grindal. He was appointed rector of Great Dunmow, Essex, on 26 September 1564, where he died in 1578.

== Career ==
Philemon Holland was educated at King Edward VI Grammar School, Chelmsford, before going on to Trinity College, Cambridge about 1568, where he was tutored by John Whitgift, later Archbishop of Canterbury. Holland received a BA in 1571, and was elected a minor Fellow at Trinity on 28 September 1573 and a major Fellow on 3 April 1574. His fellowship was terminated automatically when he married in 1579.

After his marriage Holland moved to Coventry, about 25 miles from the home of his wife's family at Perry Hall. He became usher (assistant master) at King Henry VIII School, founded in 1545 by John Hales. The position brought him a house and £10 a year.

On 11 July 1585 Holland was incorporated MA at Oxford, and in 1597 was granted the degree of MD at Cambridge.

Holland was admitted to the freedom of the city of Coventry on 30 September 1612, and when King James visited the city on 2 September 1617, he was chosen to make a speech in the King's honour. He wore a suit of black satin for the occasion, and his oration is said to have been "much praised". It was later published as A learned, elegant and religious Speech delivered unto His...Maiestie, at...Coventry.

In addition to his school-teaching duties, Holland became by 1613 tutor to George Berkeley (later 8th Baron Berkeley), whose home was nearby at Caludon Castle. On 23 January 1628, when he was 77 years of age, the mayor and aldermen of Coventry appointed Holland head schoolmaster; according to Sharpe, the order of appointment contains an original signature of Holland's. It appears the position was given to him at his advanced age out of respect for his talents and service to the city, and in the hope of ameliorating his financial situation. However he retained it for only 14 months, formally requesting to be relieved on 26 November 1628.

On 24 October 1632 the mayor and alderman granted him a pension of £3 6s 8d for the ensuing three years, "forasmuch as Dr. Holland, by reason of his age, is now grown weak and decayed in his estate."

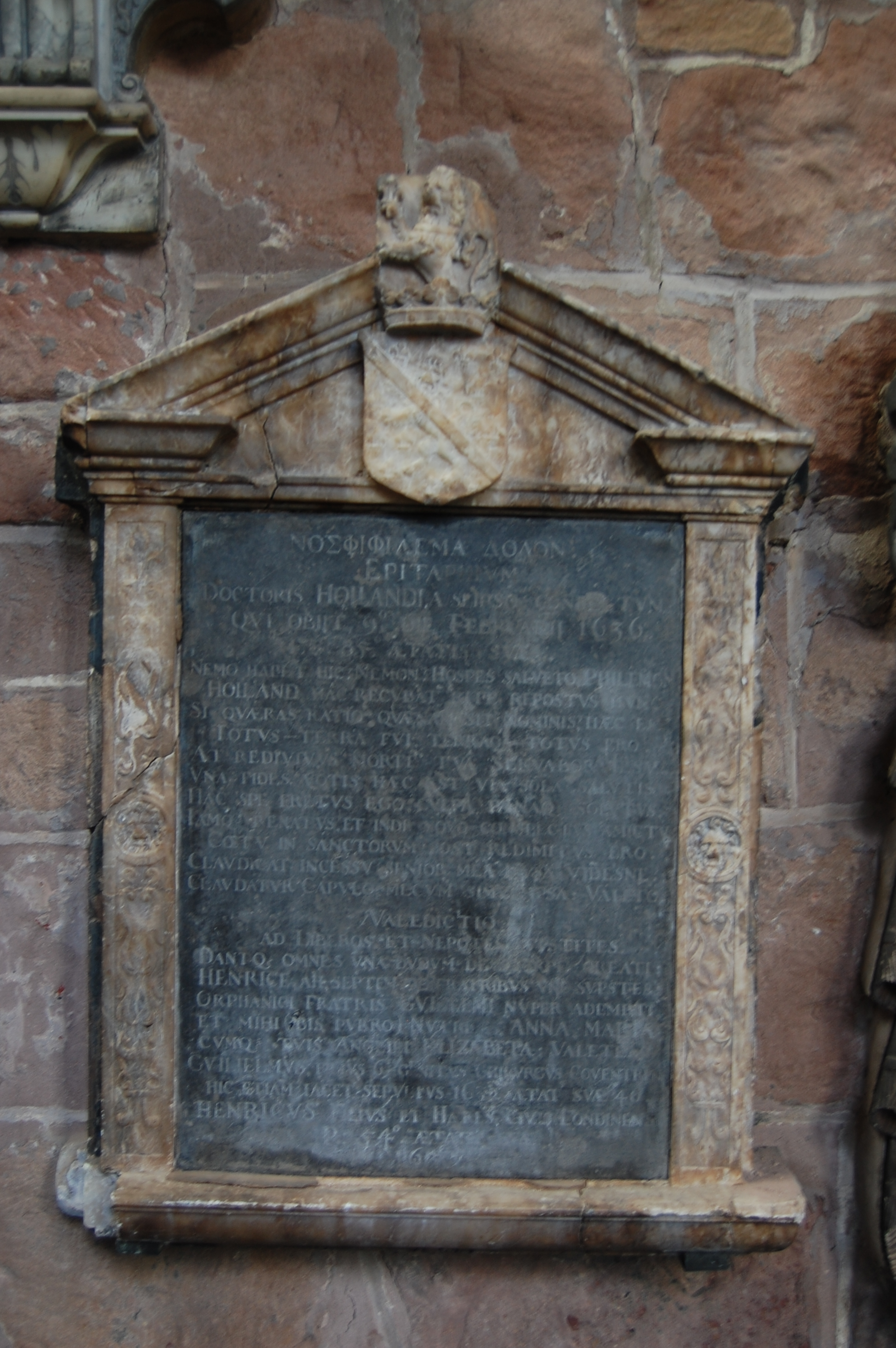
Mural tablet to Philemon Holland in Holy Trinity Church, Coventry

On 11 April 1635 a licence was granted by Henry Smythe, Vice-chancellor of the University of Cambridge to the Masters and Fellows of all colleges at Cambridge to bestow such charitable benevolence on Holland as they should see fit, considering his learning and his financial need. In 1636 he was already bedridden. He died at Coventry on 9 February 1637 and was buried at Holy Trinity Church, where he is remembered in an epitaph of his own composition, lamenting the deaths of the six sons who had predeceased him. Holland's wife, Anne, who died in 1627 at the age of 72, is also buried in the church, where there is a Latin epitaph to her composed by her son, Henry.

== Works ==
Holland combined his teaching and medical practice with the translation of classical and contemporary works. His first published translation, The Romane Historie (1600), was the first complete rendering of Livy's Latin history of Rome, Ab Urbe Condita, into English. According to John Considine:

It was a work of great importance, presented in a grand folio volume of 1458 pages, and dedicated to the Queen. The translation set out to be lucid and unpretentious, and achieved its aim with marked success. It is accurate, and often lively, and although it does not attempt to imitate the terseness of Latin, it avoids prolixity. As part of his book Holland translated two other substantial works – an ancient epitome of Roman history which provides an outline of the lost books of Livy, and Bartolomeo Marliani's guide to the topography of Rome – as well as some smaller texts. These were taken from the edition of Livy published in Paris in 1573; by translating them, Holland was making available in English a great learned compendium of historical knowledge, not simply a single ancient author.

In 1601 Holland published in two folios "an equally huge translation" from Latin, Pliny the Elder's The Historie of the World, dedicated to Sir Robert Cecil, then the Queen's Principal Secretary. This was perhaps the most popular of Holland's translations. Considine says of it:

This encyclopaedia of ancient knowledge about the natural world had already had a great indirect influence in England, as elsewhere in Europe, but had not been translated into English before, and would not be again for 250 years. Indeed, after four centuries, Holland is still the only translator of this work to attempt to evoke its literary richness and beauty.

In 1603 Holland published The Philosophie, commonly called, the Morals, dedicating it to King James. This was the first English translation of Plutarch's Moralia. Holland followed the Greek of Plutarch's original, and made use as well of a Latin translation and of the French translation of 1572 by Jacques Amyot. Holland is said to have claimed that he wrote out the whole of his translation of the Moralia with a single quill, which was later preserved by Lady Harington:

This Booke I wrote with one poore Pen, made of a grey Goose quill
A Pen I found it, us'd before, a Pen I leave it still.

Summing up this early period of extraordinary productivity, Considine points out, "In all, over the four years 1600–1603, Holland published 4332 folio pages of translations of the very highest quality." Three years later came The Historie of Twelve Caesars (1606), his translation of Suetonius's De Vita Caesarum, dedicated to Lady Anne Harington (c. 1554–1620), daughter of Robert Keilway, Surveyor of the Court of Wards and Liveries, and wife of John Harington, 1st Baron Harington of Exton.

In 1609 he published his translation of the surviving books of Ammianus Marcellinus's history of the Roman Empire in the later 4th century AD, dedicating it to the mayor and aldermen of Coventry. The Corporation paid £4 towards the publication.

In 1610 Holland translated the 1607 edition of William Camden's Britannia into English. Although he appears to have been solely responsible for the translation, the work was expanded with a certain amount of new material supplied by Camden. One of the printer-publishers of the volume was John Norton, to whom Holland's son, Henry, had been apprenticed, and it was probably Henry who recruited his father to the project. Philemon in turn found a patron in Elizabeth, Lady Berkeley, whose son, George, he would later tutor: she appears to have offered £20 towards the publication, and considered doubling this to £40. However, when the first printed pages were circulated, it was reported that Camden "misliketh it & thinketh he [i. e. Holland] hath don him wrong", and Lady Berkeley may have reconsidered her support: her patronage is not mentioned in the published volume. At the last minute, Coventry Corporation contributed £5 towards the publication. A second edition, entered in the Stationers' Register in 1625, was not published until 1637.

In 1615 Holland published Thomae Thomasii Dictionarium, a supplement to the Latin dictionary published in 1587 by the Cambridge printer, Thomas Thomas (1553–1588), adding to Thomas's original some 6000 words and meanings culled from the works of both ancient and modern Latin authors. In the following year he published Theatrum Imperii Magnae Britanniae, a translation from English into Latin of Speed's The Theatre of the Empire of Great Britaine.

In 1617 he translated the Regimen Sanitatis Salerni, publishing it together with Thomas Paynell's earlier translation of Arnaldus de Villa Nova's commentary on the Regimen.

Holland also translated Xenophon's Cyropaedia, completing a first draft in 1621, and continuing to work on it for the ensuing decade. It was published in 1632, prefaced by his portrait and a dedication to Charles I by Holland's son, the printer Henry Holland. The volume included a reprint of a poem on the Battle of Lepanto by another son, the poet Abraham Holland, and a description by Henry Holland of his father's signet ring.

== Translation style ==
Holland's translation style was free and colloquial, sometimes employing relatively obscure dialect and archaic vocabulary, and often expanding on his source text in the interests of clarity. He justified this approach in prefaces to his translations of Livy and Pliny, saying that he had opted for "a meane and popular stile", and for "that Dialect or Idiome which [is] familiar to the basest clowne", while elaborating on the original in order to avoid being "obscure and darke". When fragments of poetry were cited in the works Holland translated, he usually versified them into couplets.

== Reputation ==
Holland was well regarded in his lifetime, both for the quantity and quality of his translations. A piece of doggerel, composed after the publication of Suetonius's Historie in 1606 (and playing on Suetonius's cognomen), ran:

Phil: Holland with translations doth so fill us,
He will not let Suetonius be Tranquillus

Thomas Fuller, writing in the mid-17th century, included Holland among his Worthies of England, terming him "the translator general in his age, so that those books alone of his turning into English will make a country gentleman a competent library for historians."

However, his colloquial language soon dated. John Aubrey, reading his translations of Livy and Pliny as an undergraduate in the 1640s, compiled lists of examples of what he saw as quaint and archaic terms. Edmund Bohun published a new translation of Livy in 1686, criticising Holland's version by saying that "our English Language is much refined within the last four score years", and in 1692–1693, Holland's edition of Britannia was described as "a very bad one, and the Translation very ill". Twentieth-century critics were more generous. It has been suggested that "Holland's Pliny is sometimes superior, despite the antiquated language he uses, to the 20th-century English translations commonly available", and that there are passages in his translation of Plutarch's Moralia which "have hardly been excelled by any later prose translator of the classics."

== Marriage and issue ==
On 10 February 1579 Holland married Anne Bott (1555–1627), the daughter of William Bott (alias Peyton) of Perry Hall, Handsworth, Staffordshire, by whom he had seven sons and three daughters, including the poet Abraham Holland, the publisher and miscellanist Henry Holland, the print publisher Compton Holland (died 1622), the surgeon William Holland (1592–1632), whose treatise on gout, Gutta Podagrica, was published posthumously in 1633, and Elizabeth Holland, who married a London merchant, William Angell.
