= Magdalena van de Passe =

Dutch artist (1600–1638)

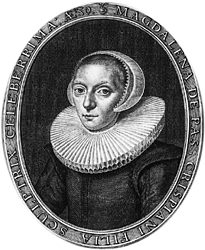
- Portrait of Magdalena van de Passe by her brother Simon van de Passe, 1630
- Born: 1600; Cologne, Germany
- Died: 1638 (aged 37–38)
- Style: Engraving
- Spouse: Frederick van Bevervoorden

Magdalena van de Passe (1600–1638) was a Dutch engraver and member of the Van de Passe family of artists from Cologne who were active in the Northern Netherlands. She specialized in landscapes and portraits, and trained the polymath Anna Maria van Schurman in engraving, one of the few known early examples of the training of one woman artist by another.

== Biography ==
Magdalena was born in Cologne, Germany. She was the daughter of the engraver Crispijn van de Passe, and the sister of Simon, Crispijn II, Willem, and Martha. She signed her first works at the age of 14, two years younger than her brothers. When she was 33 or 34, she married the artist Frederick van Bevervoordt, but he died two years later. After his death, she returned to live with her father. It is unknown whether she continued to work as an engraver after this point. She taught Anna Maria van Schurman engraving.

Like her siblings, she assisted her father with his engraving projects. She is known for landscapes and portraits, but also collaborated with her brother Willem on 65 engravings for Henry Holland's Heroologia Anglica, published in 1620. She helped her father with an illustration of Karel van Mander's translation of Ovid's Metamorphoses, but this major project was never completed.

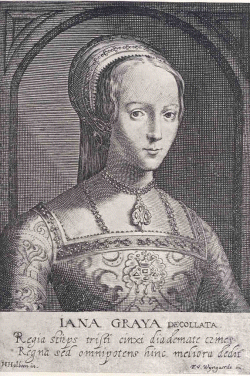
Lady Jane Grey from the Heroologia

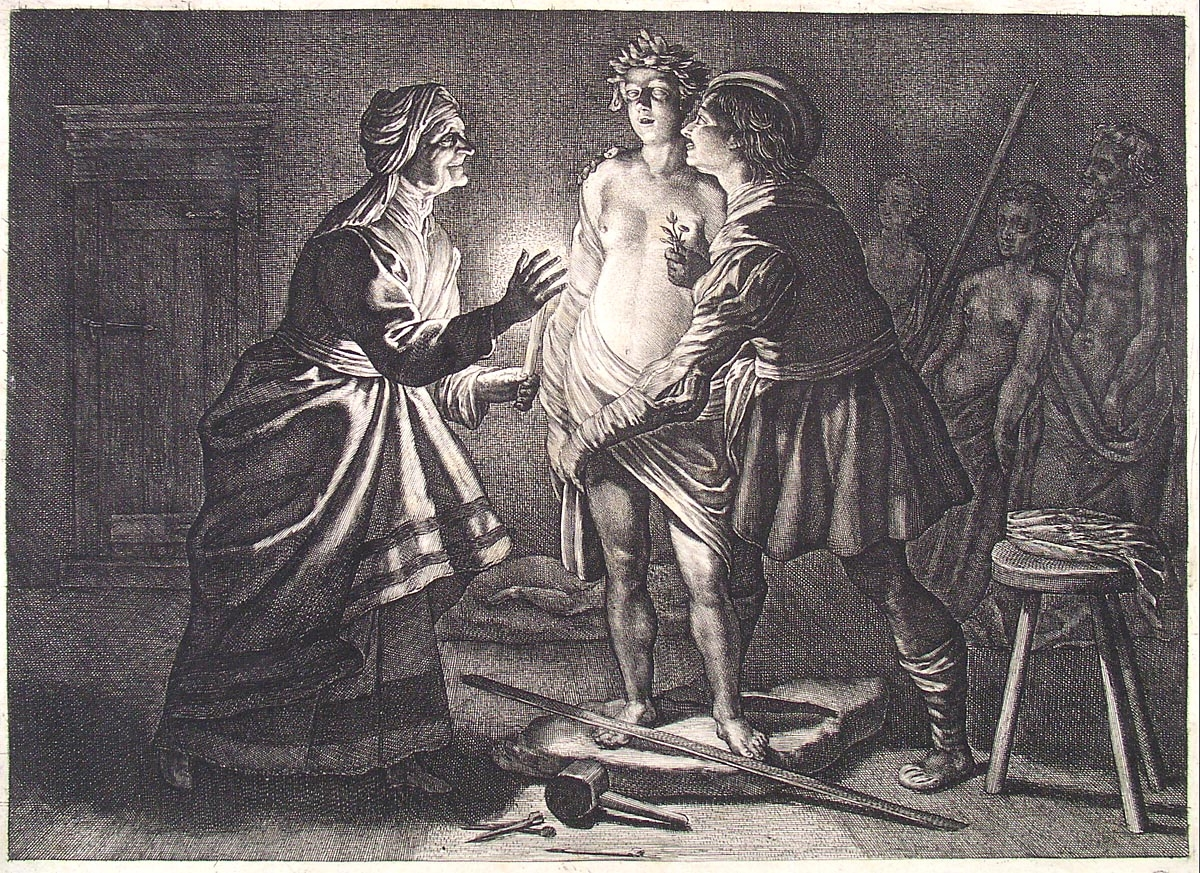
Pygmalion

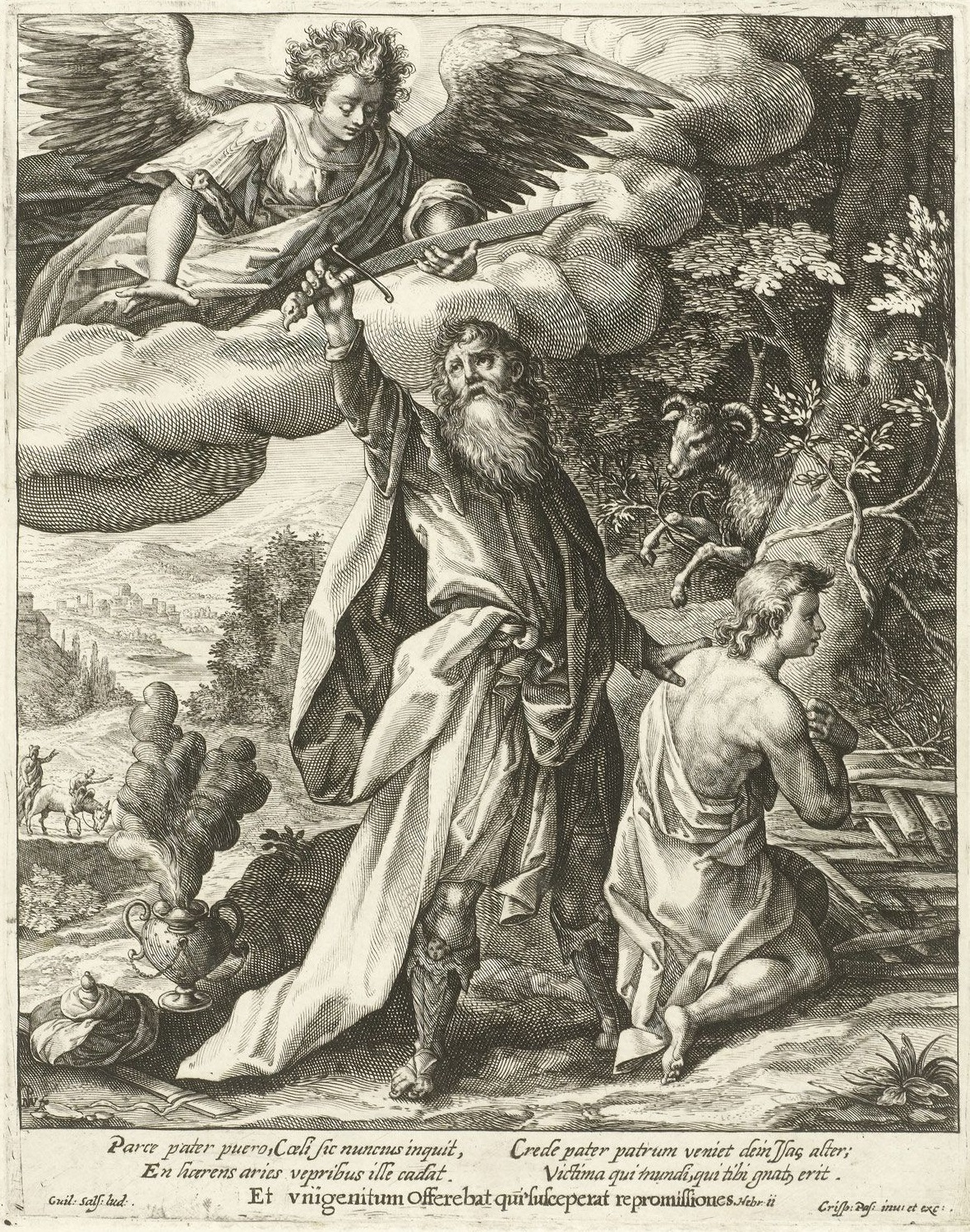
The Sacrifice of Abraham

She was friends with the painter Adriaen van de Venne, who wrote a poem dedicated to her, as did the family friend Arnold Buchelius. She was granted a patent from the States General for the manufacture of sleeping caps printed with engravings of popular figures. Though these seem to have been quite popular, none survive today. She died in Utrecht.
