= Henry Holland (printer) =

English bookseller and printer (1583–1650)

Henry Holland (1583–1650?) was an English bookseller and printer.

== Life ==
Henry Holland, born at Coventry on 29 September 1583, was one of the ten children of the translator Philemon Holland and his wife Anne Bott (1555–1627). He came to London as a youth, and usually designated himself Londonopolitanus. He was made free of the Stationers' Company on 5 December 1608.

In 1613 he accompanied John Harington, 1st Baron Harington of Exton, whose family had been on friendly terms with his father, to the Electorate of the Palatinate, when Harington accompanied Elizabeth of Bohemia to the home of her husband, Frederick V, Elector Palatine.

Holland's last days were spent in poverty. On 26 June 1647 was issued a broadsheet addressed appealing for charitable aid: it cited his anti-Catholic views and service in the life-guards of Basil Feilding, 2nd Earl of Denbigh in the English Civil War, and support from William Gouge amongst others. The title-page of his father's posthumously published Regimen shows that Holland was still alive in 1649.

== Works ==
The first book published by him was Thomas Draxe's Sicke Man's Catechisme (London, 1609), which was licensed to Holland and John Wright jointly on 4 February 1609. In 1610 he published A Royal Elegie on Edward VI, by Sir John Cheke, from a previously unprinted manuscript.

Holland acted also as a compiler, and his reputation made by two illustrated antiquarian works, with letterpress from his own pen. The earlier was Baziliωlogia. The engravers employed included Renold Elstracke, Simon Pass, and Francis Delaram (who made the portraits of Queens Mary and Elizabeth and Princes Henry and Charles). There were 31 portraits besides the title-page engraved with portraits of James I and Queen Anne. The title-page plate was used with fresh lettering for the title of Giovanni Francesco Biondi's Civil Wars of England (1641), translated by Henry Carey, 2nd Earl of Monmouth.

Holland's second illustrated publication Herωologia Anglica, which was called by Roy Strong a "Protestant pantheon". It appeared in 1620 in two folio volumes, the first dedicated to James I and the second to the universities of Cambridge and Oxford. Holland's letterpress is in Latin throughout. The work opens with a portrait of Henry VIII, and closes with one of Thomas Holland. There are sixty-five portraits in all, and two engravings of monuments (of Prince Henry and Queen Elizabeth respectively).

In 1614 Holland published, in conjunction with M. Laws, a compilation Monumenta Sepulchraria Sancti Pauli, A reissue, entitled Ecclesia Sancti Pauli illustrata, and continued to 1633, was published (J. Norton … sold by H. Seyle) in 1633, with a dedication by Holland, addressed to William Laud, then Bishop of London, and to the dean and chapter of St Paul's Cathedral.

Other publications included

- Newes from Frankfort, 1612
- Newes from Gulick and Cleve, 1615 (jointly with G. Gibbs)

In 1626 he printed at his own expense and published at Cambridge his brother Abraham Holland's posthumous works as Hollandi Posthuma. To Salomon's Pest House, by I. D., which he published with T. Harper in 1630, he added "Mr. Hollands Admonition", a poem by his brother Abraham.

Holland helped his father with his later publications. He wrote the dedication to Charles I of his father's Cyropaedia of Xenophon (1632), and edited after Philemon's death his Latin version of Brice Bauderon's Pharmacopœia in 1639, and his Regimen Sanitatis Salerni in 1649.
