= Salomon de La Broue =

French riding-master and Gascon gentleman

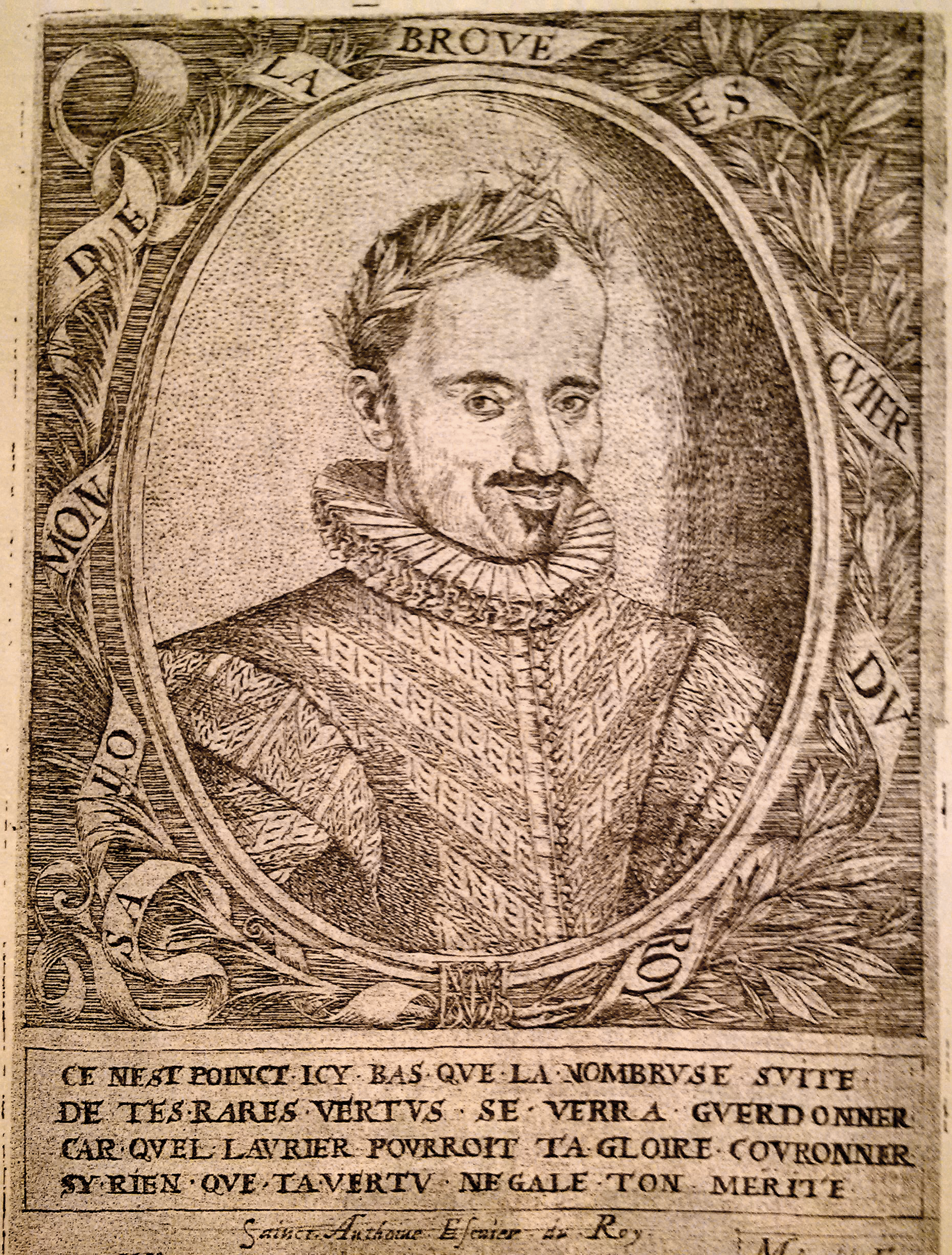
- Born: c. 1530
- Died: c. 1610
- Occupation: Riding-master
- Known for: Preceptes Principaux, 1593; Cavalerice françois, 1602

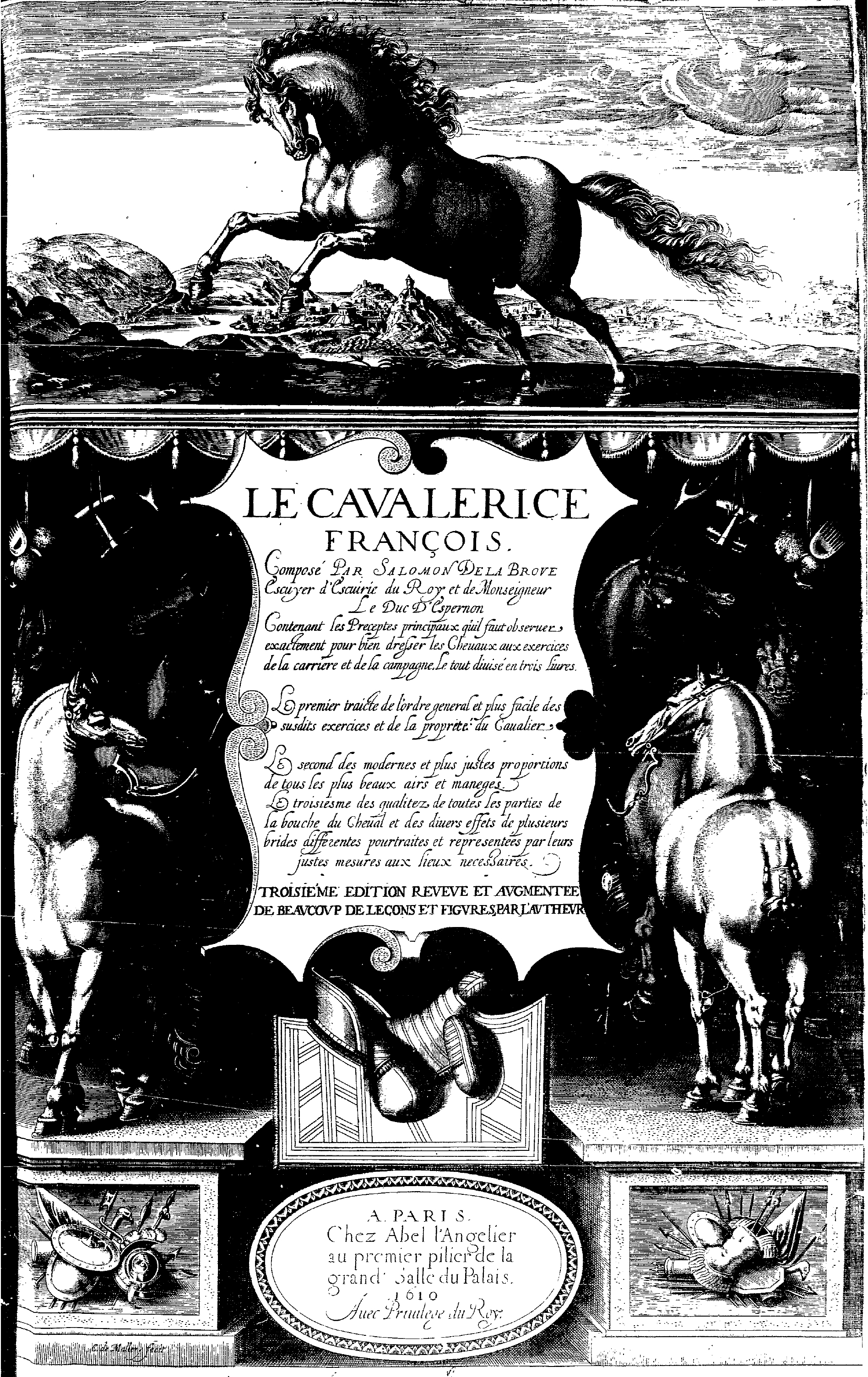
Title-page of the 1610 edition of the Cavalerice françois

Salomon de La Broue (c. 1530 – c. 1610) was a French écuyer or riding-master and Gascon gentleman. His treatise on riding, published as the Preceptes Principaux in 1593, was the first to have been written in French. Like Antoine de Pluvinel, he was a pupil of Gianbattista Pignatelli. De La Broue was écuyer to Jean Louis de Nogaret de La Valette, the first Duke of Épernon, and écuyer ordinaire of the Grande Écurie du Roi in the reign of Henri IV.

De La Broue, like Pluvinel, was one of the founders of the old French haute école. His methods centred on calmness in hand, freedom and lightness in order to obtain the best results from the horse; he rejected the use of force or constraint in training.

== Publications ==
- Preceptes Principavx Qve les bons Caualerisses doiuent exactement obseruer en leurs Escole [1593]
- Le cavalerice françois: contenant les preceptes…, 1602 Full text of 1646 edition, vol 1; vol 2; vol 3
