= Flore, Northamptonshire =

Village in Northamptonshire, England

Coordinates: 52.2388°N 1.0569°W

Flore
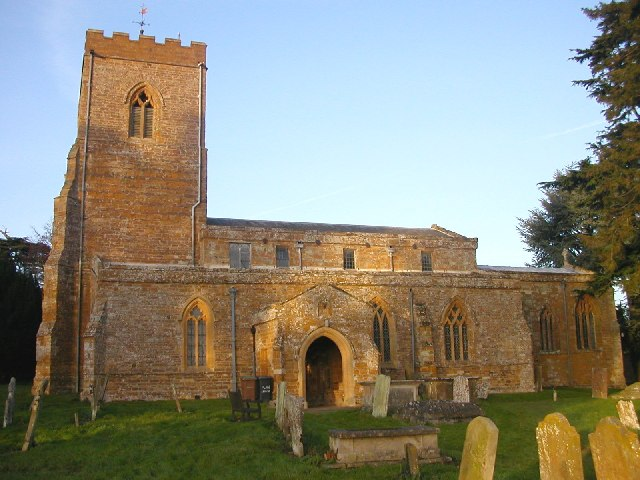
- All Saints' Church, Flore

- Flag

- Location within Northamptonshire
- Population: 1,194 (2011)
- OS grid reference: SP6460
- Unitary authority: West Northamptonshire
- Ceremonial county: Northamptonshire
- Region: East Midlands
- Country: England
- Sovereign state: United Kingdom
- Post town: Northampton
- Postcode district: NN7
- Dialling code: 01327
- Police: Northamptonshire
- Fire: Northamptonshire
- Ambulance: East Midlands
- UK Parliament: Daventry

Flore (historically spelled as Floore) is a village and civil parish in West Northamptonshire in England.

The village's name means 'Floor', perhaps referring to a Roman tessellated pavement. South of the neighbouring parish of Nether Heyford such a pavement has been unearthed. Alternatively, it may refer to the situation of the village in the valley bottom of the River Nene.

The A45 road divided the upper part of the village from several older, lower streets until a bypass opened on 15 November 2018. The historical village of Glassthorpe lay in the vicinity.

The population at the 2001 census was 1,221, falling to 1,194 at the 2011 census.

The Grade II listed Flore House was built in 1608 for the Enyon family.

The thatched cottage in Flore called Adams Cottage (location) is said to be the home of the ancestors of John Adams, the second President of the United States of America.
