= Flore House, Northamptonshire =

Country house in Flore, Northamptonshire, England

Coordinates: 52°14′03″N 1°03′44″W

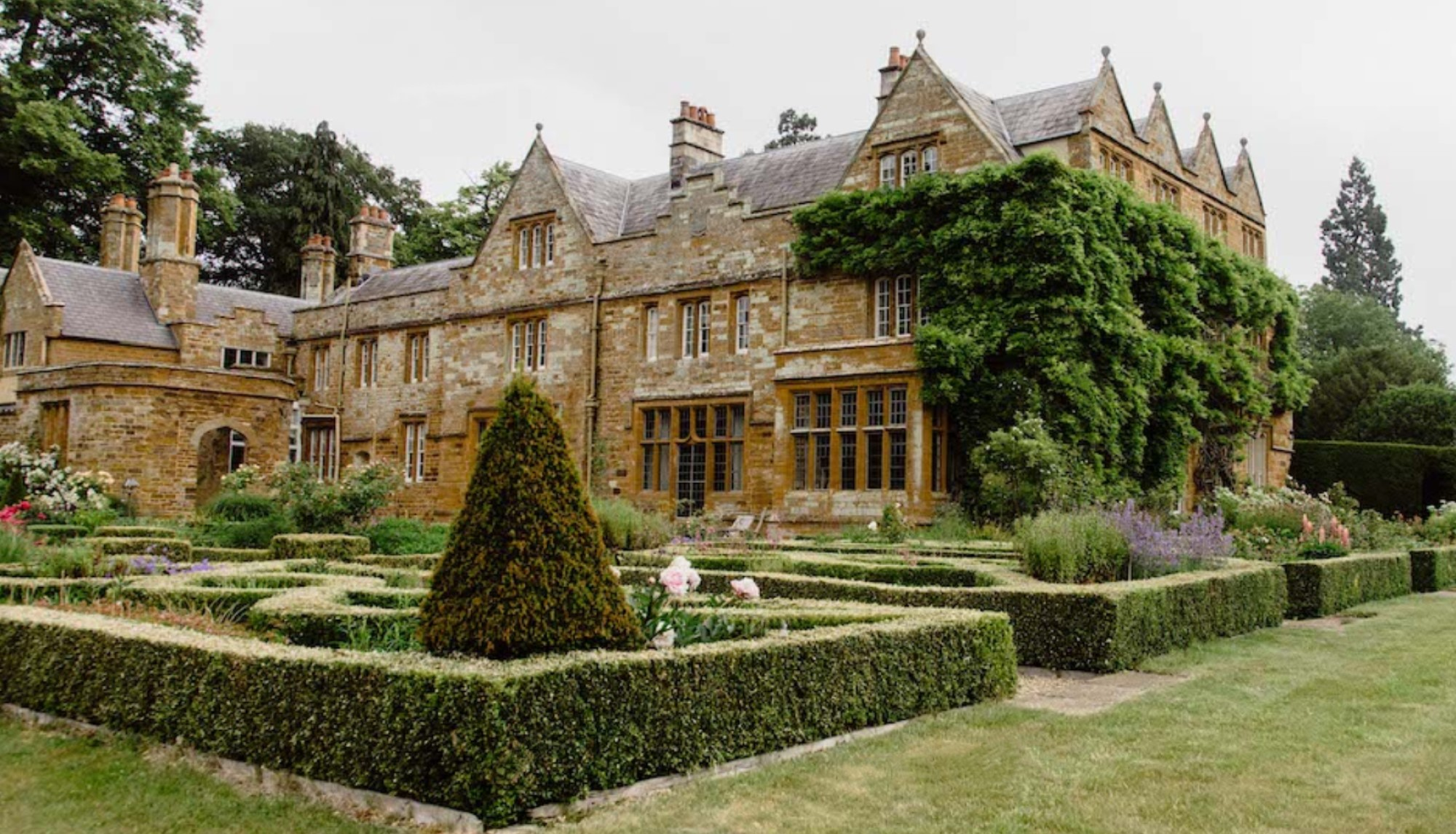
Flore House

Flore House in Flore, Northamptonshire, is a country house of historical significance and is Grade II listed on the English Heritage Register. It was built in 1608 for the Enyon family and was the residence of notable people over the next four centuries. Today it provides guest accommodation and caters for special events including weddings.

== Early residents ==
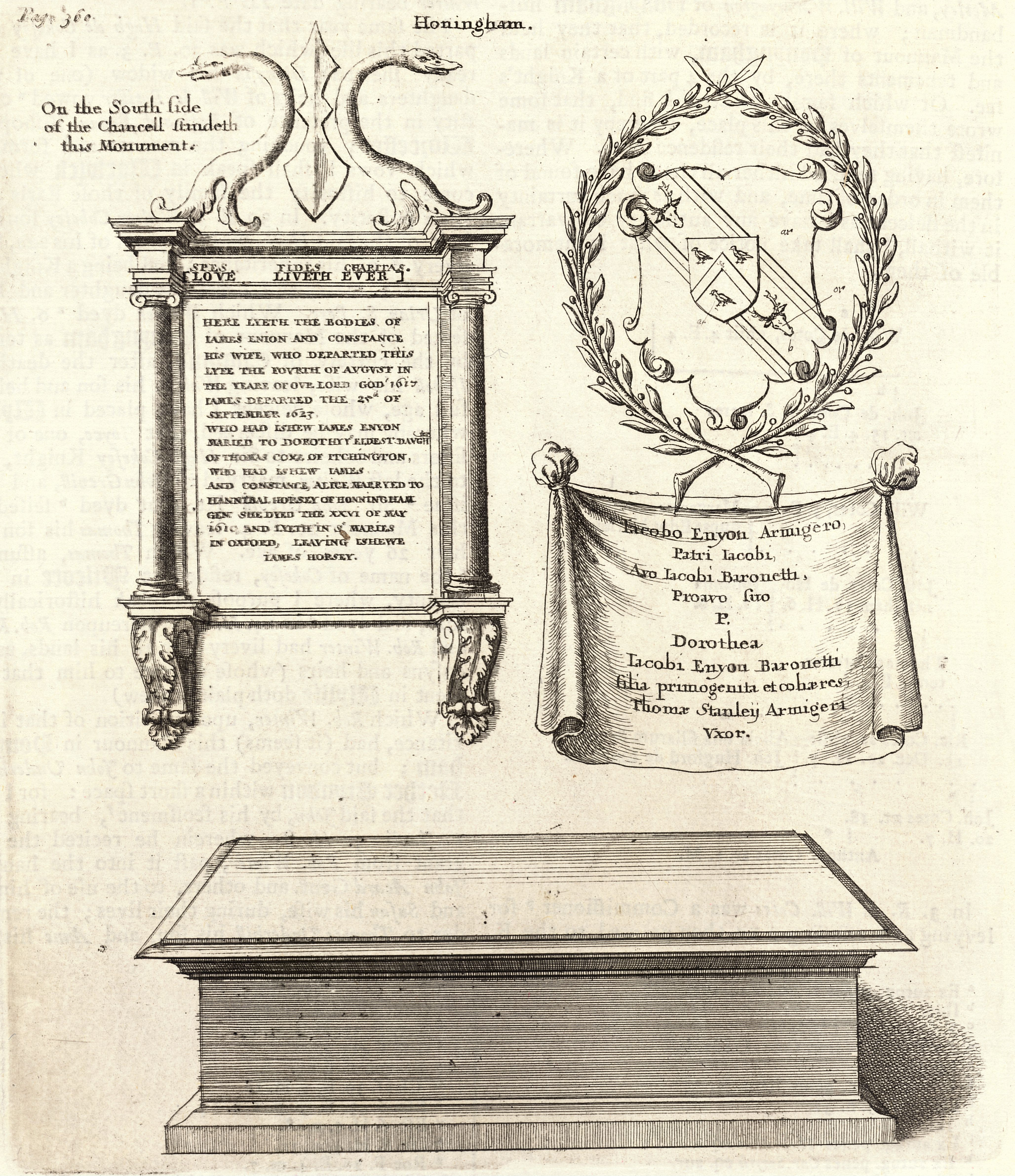
Drawing by Wenceslaus Hollar of the tomb and memorial to James and his wife Constance Enyon in St Margaret's Church, Hunnington

James Enyon (1560–1623) built Flore House in 1608. He was a wealthy landowner and owned the Swan Brewery in Whitechapel. He also had a house in Hunnington (then in Shropshire) and in St Margaret’s Church in that village there is a marble memorial on the wall in honour of him and his wife Constance who died in 1617. Originally the church contained the tomb of the couple which was drawn by Wenceslaus Hollar in about 1650 and is shown here.

After he died in 1623 he left Flore House to his grandson Sir James Enyon (1620–1642) who was married to Jane Newton, daughter of Sir Adam Newton of Charlton, London. The couple had three daughters. In 1642 he died after fighting in a duel with Sir Nicholas Crispe. He left his property divided into three portions to his three daughters. His eldest daughter Dorothy married Thomas Stanley, the poet.

By 1668 the three portions were owned by Henry Rushton (1637–1700). He was born in 1627 in Northampton. His father was an attorney and Henry became the Town Steward. In about 1670 he married Grace Stratford who was the daughter of Edward Stratford of Nuneaton. When Henry died in 1700 (he was buried at Flore) his eldest son William Rushton who lived in Charwelton inherited the house. He sold it in 1727 shortly after his mother’s death to George Devall of London.

George Devall was a plumber to King George II. He was in charge of the water services at Hampton Court Palace. He became wealthy and bought several properties. He died in 1743 and left his estates to his son John Devall (1714–1769). John married in 1738 Sarah Mist. When he died in 1769 he left Flore House to Sarah and two years later she sold it to Richard Kerby. Richard Kerby lived at Flore House until his death in 1804. He had no children so he left the property to his sister Mary until her death and then after that to his nephew Richard Pack.

== Later residents ==
Richard Pack (1768–1838) was the son of Christopher Pack of London and Richard Kerby’s sister Ann Kerby. In 1802 he married Mary Freeman (1781–1859). He was appointed as Sheriff of Northamptonshire in 1830. When Richard died in 1838 his son John Christopher Pack inherited the property and although he did not live there he retained ownership of it until his death in 1879. During this time he rented it to wealthy tenants. The first was Lieutenant General William Cartwright (1797–1873) who lived at Flore House for over forty years. He is recorded in the 1851 Census as living there with his wife, a butler, a footman and four domestic servants. He was born in 1797 in Bath. His father was William Ralph Cartwright, a wealthy landowner and politician who owned Aynhoe Park. He was educated at Eton College and then went to the Royal Military College, Sandhurst. By 1815 he was in the 10th Royal Hussars and fought with them in the Battle of Waterloo. In 1822 he William married Mary Ann Jones (1803–1860) and the couple had a son and a daughter. He died in 1873 and the house was rented to Arthur Cecil Tempest.

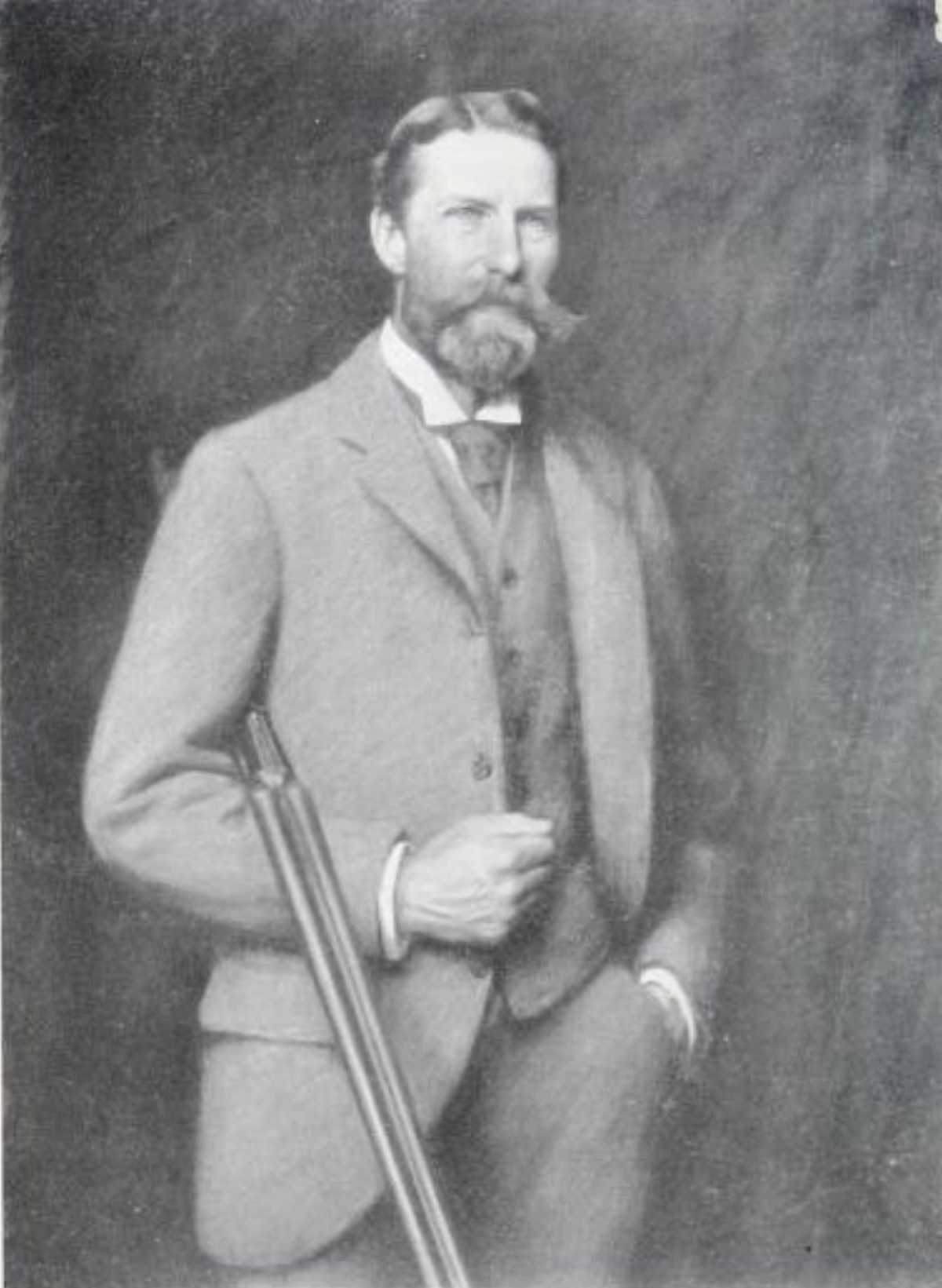
Sir Edmund Loder

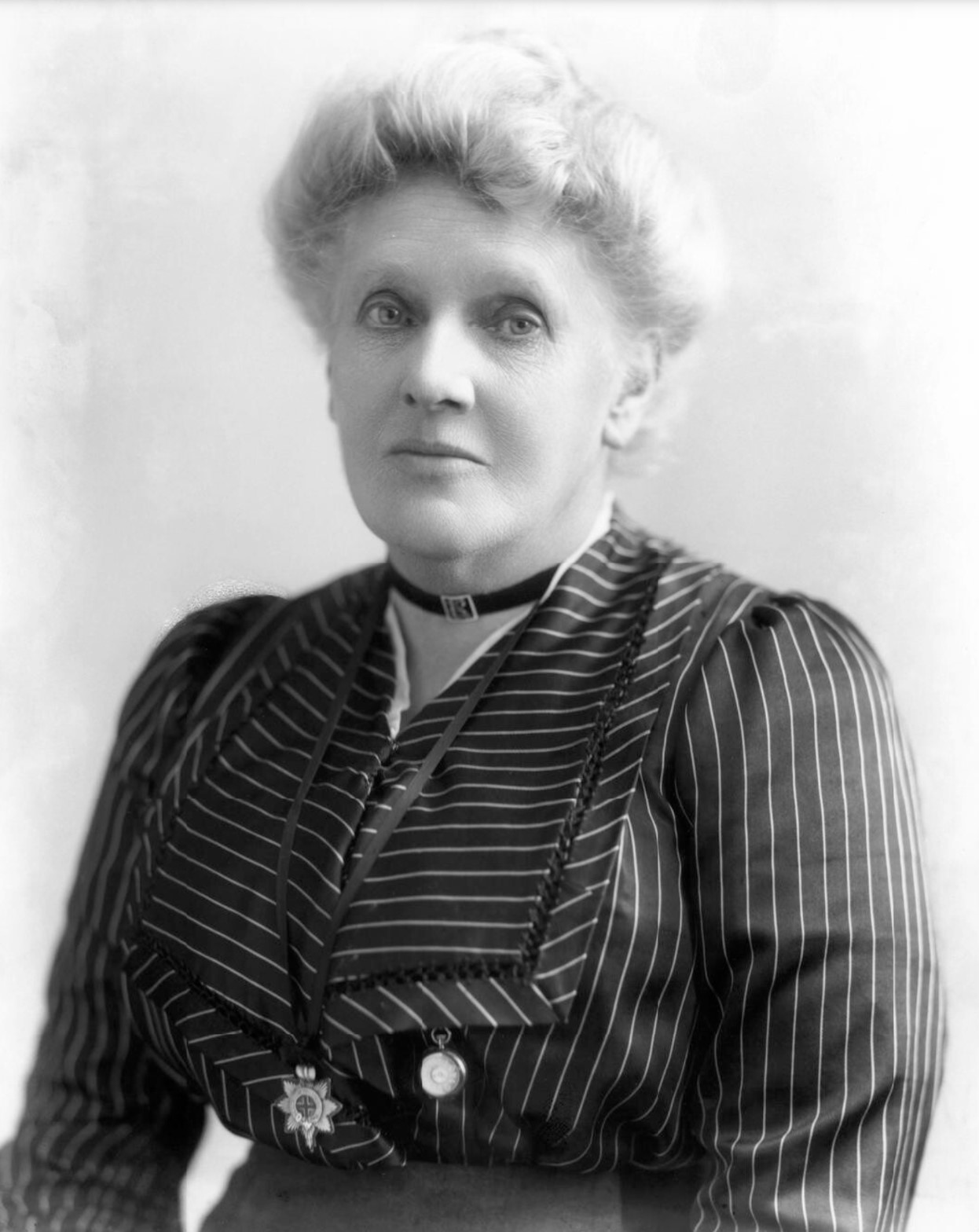
Lady Marion Loder

Major Arthur Cecil Tempest (1837–1920) was an army officer and rented Flore House shortly after his retirement. His wife was Eleanor Blanche Reynard (1853–1928) and their two children were both born at the house.

In about 1877 Sir Robert Loder, 1st Baronet of Whittlebury Park bought the house as a wedding present for his son Sir Edmund Giles Loder (1849–1920). Edmund was a landowner and horticulturalist. In 1876 he married Marion Hubbard who was the daughter of William Egerton Hubbard of Leonardslee. Edmund’s friend Sir Alfred Pease wrote a book on his life in which he describes Edmund’s residency at Flore House. He said.

"Here Loder lived the life of a country gentleman, filling his days with a greater variety of pursuits than most men can make time for. He devoted himself to astronomy, to the making of a lovely rock garden (there were few in those days), to horticulture and natural science. In the autumns they were in Scotland, in the winters he hunted regularly with the Pytchley and had the reputation one would expect of " going very hard." Here also he began to put his ideas into practice of turning a part of his grounds into a little zoo, beginning, I believe, with emus and mouflon. He took during his father's life a great interest in the improvement of the red deer and the herd of fallow deer in Whittlebury Park and in the acclimatisation there of the wapiti which he imported from America."

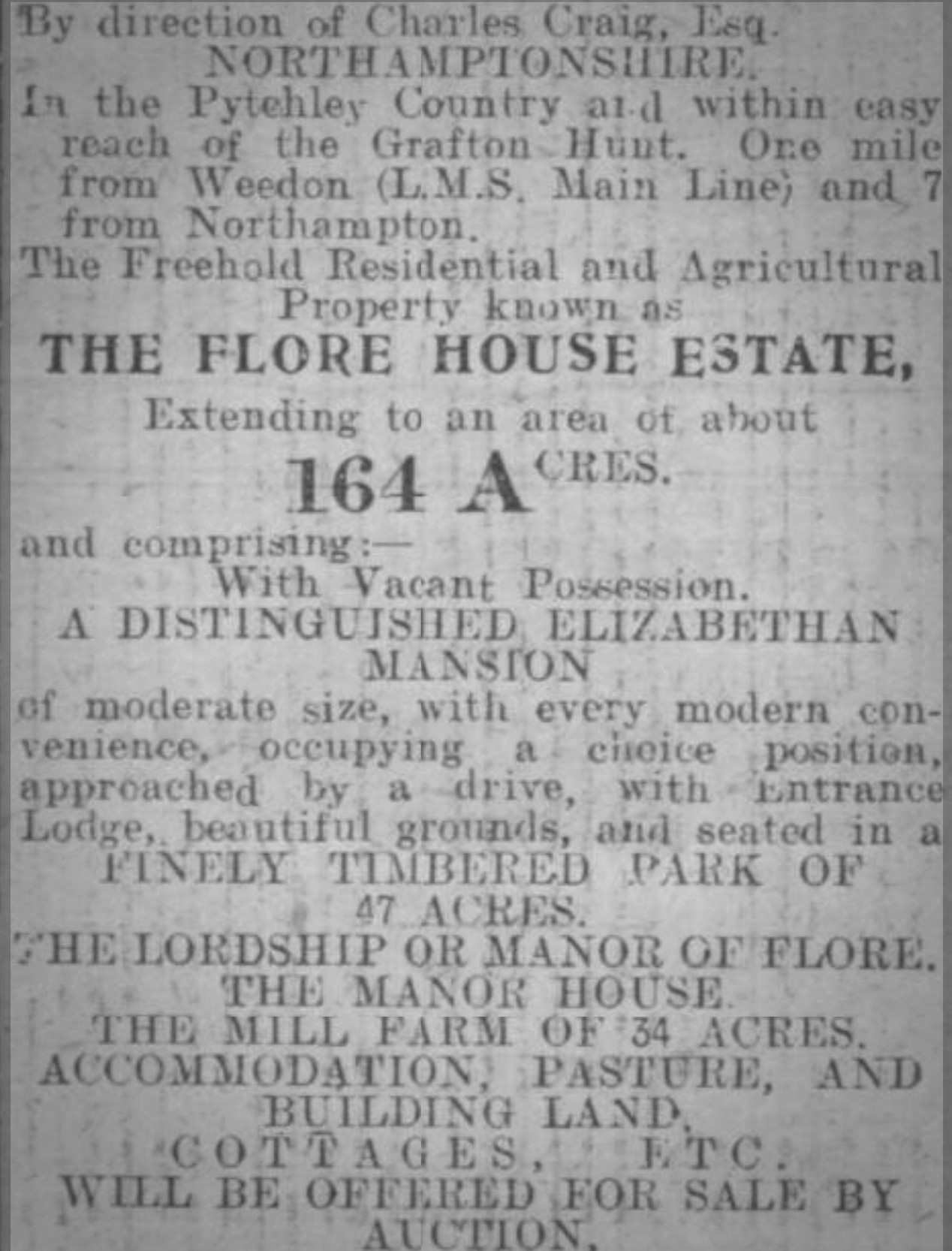
Sale notice for Flore House 1924

Sir Robert Loder died in 1888 and left Flore House to another son Sydney Loder. Edmund inherited Whittlebury Park but bought from Marion’s family their property called Leonardslee where he lived until his death in 1920.

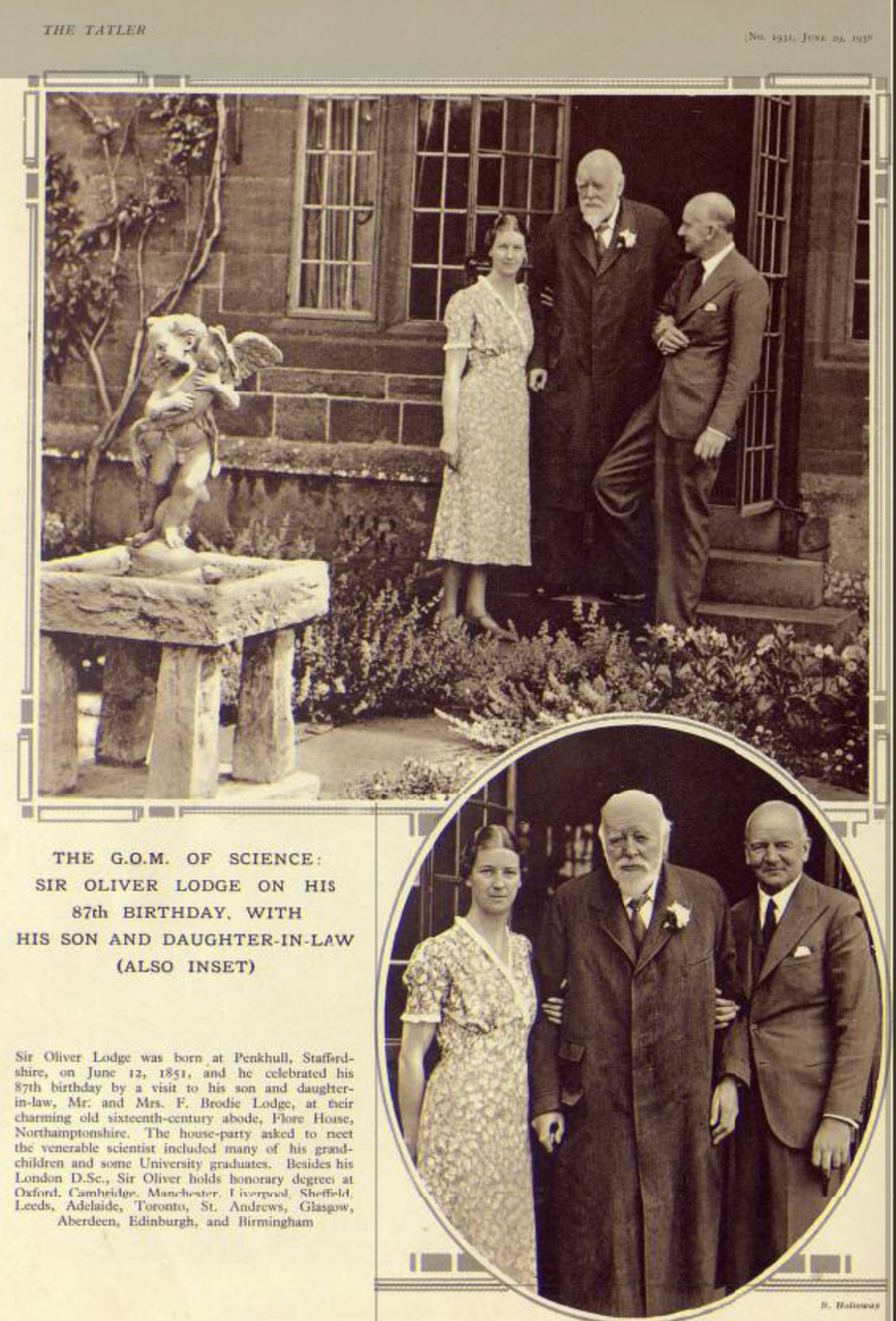
Enid Lodge, Sir Oliver Lodge and Brodie Lodge at Flore House in 1938

Sydney Loder sold Flore House to Charles Craig (1854–1938) in 1900. He was a partner of the Scottish blotting paper firm R. Craig and Sons. In 1885 he married Katherine James Stitt (1863–1926) and the couple had one son and three daughters. The 1911 Census records the family living at Flore House with a butler, a footman and six domestic servants. They sold the house in 1924 and the advertisement for the sale is shown.

Anne Rose Anderson (nee Wood)(1858–1940) was the resident from 1925 until 1836. She was the widow of William Henry Anderson (1846–1911) who was a merchant in Shanghai. The family returned to England in about 1905 and lived in Rugby. After Anne Rose’s husband died in 1911 she continued to live at Rugby until 1925 when she moved to Flore House. In 1936 the house was sold to the Lodge family.

Francis Brodie Lodge (1880–1967) (called Brodie Lodge) lived at Flore House for thirty years from 1936 until his death in 1967. He was the son of the scientist Sir Oliver Lodge. In 1904 with his brother Alex he founded the firm Lodge Spark Plugs which made them both very wealthy. He married twice. His first wife was Winifred Mackay Gunn, daughter of Sir John Gunn. However they divorced in 1928. In 1929 he married divorcee Enid Mary Broadbent Thompson (1898–1989). She had two daughters.

The couple held numerous social functions at Flore House and frequently lent the grounds for community fetes and other local events. They were very enthusiastic about oriental ceramics and had a very large collection. In 1938 they held a house party for Brodie’s father Sir Oliver Lodge and the occasion was recorded in the society magazine Tatler. The photo of the event is shown. In 1960 he donated the Brodie Lodge Playing Field at Flore to the Council which is still used by the community today. Brodie died in 1967 and his wife Enid sold the house soon after and moved to Gable House in Worcestershire.
