= Heroologia Anglica =

English short biographies in Latin

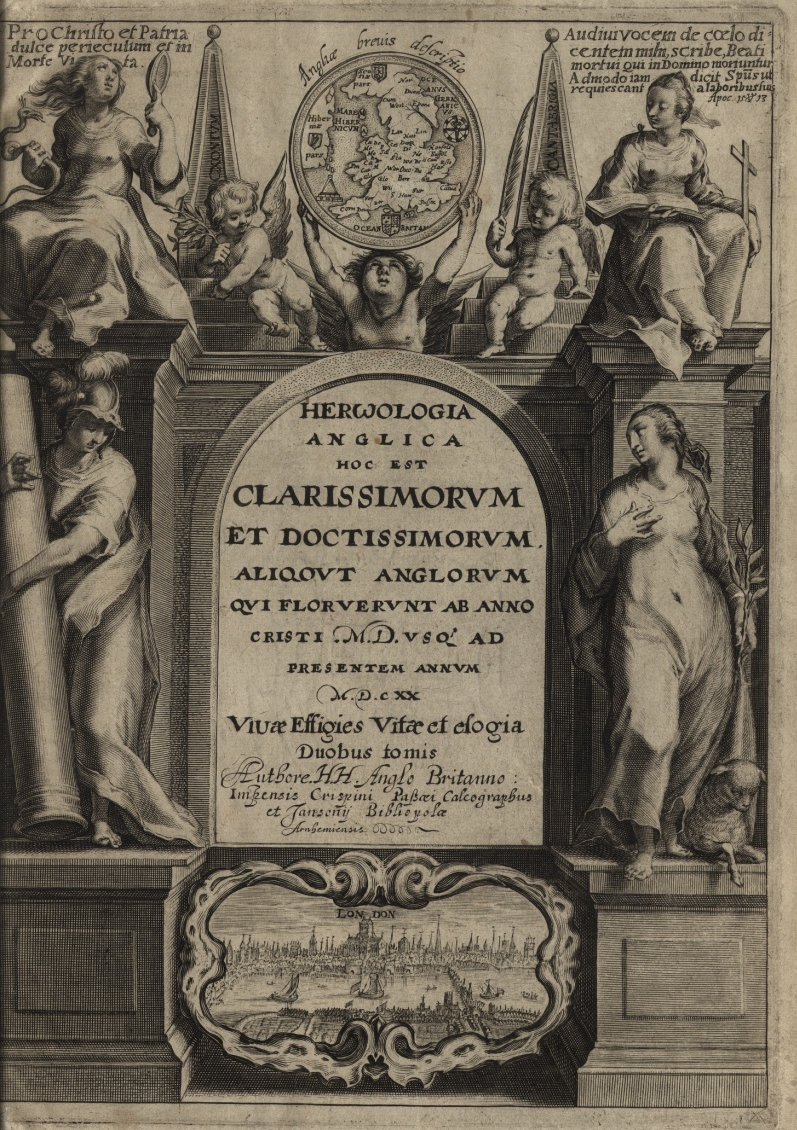
Title page, translated from Latin: “For Christ and country danger is sweet ...” (top left): English Heroology, that is, the portraits, lives, and praises of some illustrious and most learned Englishmen, who flourished from the year of Christ 1500 up to the present year 1620, in two volumes. By the author H.H., Anglo-Briton. Published at the expense of Crispijn van de Passe, engraver, and Jansson, bookseller of Arnhem.

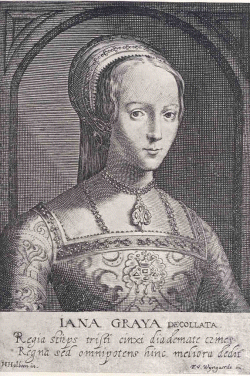
Domina Iana Graya decollata / Lady Jane Grey, beheaded (portrait)

Herωologia Anglica (“English Heroology”, also known as Praise of English Heroes) is a series of short biographies written in Latin, with engravings made by Willem and Magdalena van de Passe, and the text written and published by Henry Holland of London. The book was published in Arnhem in 1620 in two volumes at the expense of Crispijn van de Passe (father of the painters) and the bookseller Jansson.

== Notable portraits ==
This collection of portraits, accompanied by biographical and descriptive notes, includes people who lived during the reigns of Henry VIII, Edward VI, Mary, and Elizabeth, with an emphasis on reformers and opponents of the Papacy (except for Thomas More).

The Heroology holds the earliest published portraits of English historical figures including Martin Frobisher, John Hawkins and Francis Drake, and also includes a short accounts of Drake's voyages. According to art historian A. M. Hind, it is the 'most trustworthy series of English portraits published up to that time'.

The portrait of Francis Drake at page 106, also known as the “Golden Knight” (Franciscus Drake Miles Auratus), by Crispijn de Passe includes the inscription:

Quem timuit saevis timuit Neptunus in undis / Et rediit toto victor ab Oceano, / Foedifragos pellens pelago prostravit Iberos / Drakius, huic tumulus aequoris unda fuit.

Whom even Neptune feared in the savage waves, / And he returned victorious from the entire ocean, / Driving the treacherous Iberians, struck down by the sea, into defeat; / For him, the wave of the sea became a tomb.

The inscription, and the epitaph at the end of his biography, alludes to Francis Drake's burial at sea. It states that even a resurgence of the Catholic faith (“Religio Romana”) would not desecrate Drake’s grave, as he rests in the water (“in aqua”) safely beyond the reach of fire (“ab igne”) and of posterity (“posteritas”), as anyone buried in the ocean cannot be exhumed or burned.

== List of all portraits ==
This list gives the Latin forms of the names and titles given in the text, with page numbers from the original edition's index, followed by their modern English equivalents.

Henricus Octavus Rex pag. 1. / Henry VIII, King
Thomas Cromwellus, Essexiae Comes pag. 6. / Thomas Cromwell, Earl of Essex
Thomas Morus, Angliae Cancellarius pag. 9. / Thomas More, Chancellor of England
Thomas Wolseius, Cardinalis pag. 15. / Thomas Wolsey, Cardinal
Reginaldus Polus, Cardinalis pag. 19. / Reginald Pole, Cardinal
Eduardus Sextus Rex pag. 22. / Edward VI, King
Edouardus Seimor Dux Somersetensis pag. 29. / Edward Seymour, Duke of Somerset
Domina Iana Graya pag. 33. / Lady Jane Grey
Elizabetha Regina pag. 34. / Elizabeth, Queen
Henricus Walliae Princeps pag. 44. / Henry, Prince of Wales
Ioannes Checus Eques auratus pag. 53. / John Cheke, Golden Knight
Gulielmus Herbertus, Pembrochiae Comes pag. 57. / William Herbert, Earl of Pembroke
Gualtherus Deuereux, Essexie Comes pag. 59. / Walter Devereux, Earl of Essex
Nicolaus Baconis M. S. Custos pag. 61. / Nicholas Bacon, Lord Keeper of the Great Seal
Humfridus Gilbertus Miles auratus pag. 65. / Humphrey Gilbert, Golden Knight
Henricus Sydney periscellidis Eques pag. 69. / Henry Sidney, Knight of the Garter
Philippus Sydney Miles auratus pag. 70. / Philip Sidney, Golden Knight
Robertus Dudley, Comes Leicestriae pag. 74. / Robert Dudley, Earl of Leicester
Ambrosius Dudley, Comes Warwici pag. 78. / Ambrose Dudley, Earl of Warwick
Franciscus Walsinghamus, Eques auratus pag. 83. / Francis Walsingham, Golden Knight
Ricardus Grenvil, Miles auratus pag. 85. / Richard Grenville, Golden Knight
Thomas Candish, Armiger pag. 88. / Thomas Cavendish, Esquire
Christopherus Carleil, Armiger pag. 92. / Christopher Carleill, Esquire
Martinus Frobisher, Eques auratus pag. 100. / Martin Frobisher, Golden Knight
Ioannes Hawkins, Miles auratus pag. 105. / John Hawkins, Golden Knight
Franciscus Drake Miles auratus pag. 110. / Francis Drake, Golden Knight
Gulielmus Cecilius Baro Burghley pag. 114. / William Cecil, Baron Burghley
Henricus Herbertus, Pembrochiae Comes pag. 116. / Henry Herbert, Earl of Pembroke
Robertus Deuereux, Essexiae Comes pag. 120. / Robert Devereux, Earl of Essex
Georgius Clifford, Cumbrias Comes pag. 120. / George Clifford, Earl of Cumberland
Robertus Cecilius, Comes Sarisburiae pag. 124. / Robert Cecil, Earl of Salisbury
Thomas Sutton, Armiger pag. 128. / Thomas Sutton, Esquire
Ioannes Harington, Baro de Exton pag. 133. / John Harington, Baron of Exton
loannes Harington, Baro Iunior pag. 135. / John Harington, Baron junior

Ioannes Coletus, S. Pauli Decanus pag. 145. / John Colet, Dean of St Paul's
Gulielmus Tindallus, Martyr pag. 146. / William Tyndale, Martyr
Ioannes Bradfordus, Martyr pag. 151. / John Bradford, Martyr
Hugo Latimerus, Martyr pag. 154. / Hugh Latimer, Martyr
Nicolaus Ridleius, Martyr pag. 156. / Nicholas Ridley, Martyr
Ioannis Rogersius, Martyr pag. 154. / John Rogers, Martyr
Laurentius Sanderus, Martyr pag. 159. / Laurence Saunders, Martyr
Thomas Cranmerus, Archiep. Cant. & Martyr pag. 161. / Thomas Cranmer, Archbishop of Canterbury & Martyr
Ioannes Baleus Episcopus Ossoriensis pag. 165. / John Bale, Bishop of Ossory
Ioannes Iuellus Episc. Sarum pag. 169. / John Jewel, Bishop of Salisbury
Dauid Whitehead pag. 173. / David Whitehead
Matthaeus Parkerus Archiep. Cant. pag. 175. / Matthew Parker, Archbishop of Canterbury
Thomas Beconus pag. 179. / Thomas Beccon
Ioannes Cayus Medicus pag. 180. / John Caius, Physician
Edouardus Deringus pag. 195. / Edward Dering
Edmundus Grindallus Archiep. Cant. pag. 199. / Edmund Grindal, Archbishop of Canterbury
Ioannes Foxus pag. 220. / John Foxe
Edwinus Sandys Archiep. Eboracensis pag. 204. / Edwin Sandys, Archbishop of York
Laurentius Humfridus pag. 206. / Laurence Humphrey
Ioannes Morus pag. 208. / John More
Guilielmus Whitakerus pag. 213. / William Whitaker
Alexander Nowellus, S. Pauli Decanus pag. 217. / Alexander Nowell, Dean of St Paul's
Guilielmus Perkinsus pag. 218. / William Perkins
Iohannes Whitgiftus Archiep. Cant. pag. 222. / John Whitgift, Archbishop of Canterbury
Ioannes Rainoldus D. pag. 229. / John Rainolds, Doctor
Ricardus Vaughanus Episcopus London pag. 230. / Richard Vaughan, Bishop of London
Geruasius Babington Episc. Wigorniae pag. 235. / Gervase Babington, Bishop of Worcester
Thomas Hollandus D. pag. 236. / Thomas Holland, Doctor
Robertus Abbatus Episc. Sarum pag. 184. / Robert Abbot, Bishop of Salisbury
Iacobus Mountagu Episc. Winton pag. 191. / James Montagu, Bishop of Winchester

== See also ==
- Van de Passe family

== Edition ==
- Henry Holland: Heroologia Anglica hoc est Clarissimorum et Doctissimorum. aliqout [sic] Anglorum, qui floruerunt ab anno Cristi. M.D. vsq[ue] ad Presentem Annum M.D.C.XX Viuæ Effigies, Vitæ et elogia: duobus tomis. Authore. H.H. Anglo-Britanno: Impensis Crispini Passæi Calcographi, et Jansonij Bibliopolæ Arnhemiensis. [Arnhem : Printed by Jan Jansson at the expenses of Crispijn van de Passe and Jan Jansson for Henry Holland, London, 1620], Arnhem, 1620 (2 vols.)

== Bibliography ==
- Egerton Brydges: Censura Literaria: containing titles, abstracts and opinions of old English books with original disquisitions, articles of biography, and other literary antiquities, Vol. 1. London: Longman, Hurst, Rees, and Orme 1805 (Art. XIX)
- Arthur Mayger Hind: Engraving in England in the Sixteenth and Seventeenth Centuries. 3 vols. Cambridge University Press, Cambridge, 1952-64
