= Glassthorpe =

Former hamlet in Northamptonshire, England

Coordinates: 52°14′21″N 1°1′50″W

Glassthorpe is a deserted hamlet and manor between Flore and Upper Heyford in the Hundred of Nobottle of West Northamptonshire, in Northamptonshire, England. Glassthorp Hill is set in Northampton Sand with an elevation of about 125 metres (410 ft).

== History ==
Glassthorpe was mentioned in the Domesday Book of 1086 as Glassthorpehill, and had a recorded population of six people, paying 1.8 geld units in tax at the time. The feudal lord in 1088 was William of Keynes. It is mentioned in the Nomina Villarum of 1316 and was still inhabited in 1371. In 1515 it was acquired by John Spencer of the prominent Spencer family of aristocrats of Althorp. In 1547 "Classthorpe Pasture" was documented to have 200 sheep. By the early 18th century Glassthorpe had been "long depopulated", and only contained a single shepherd's house.
