= Pasquale Caracciolo =

Neapolitan nobleman

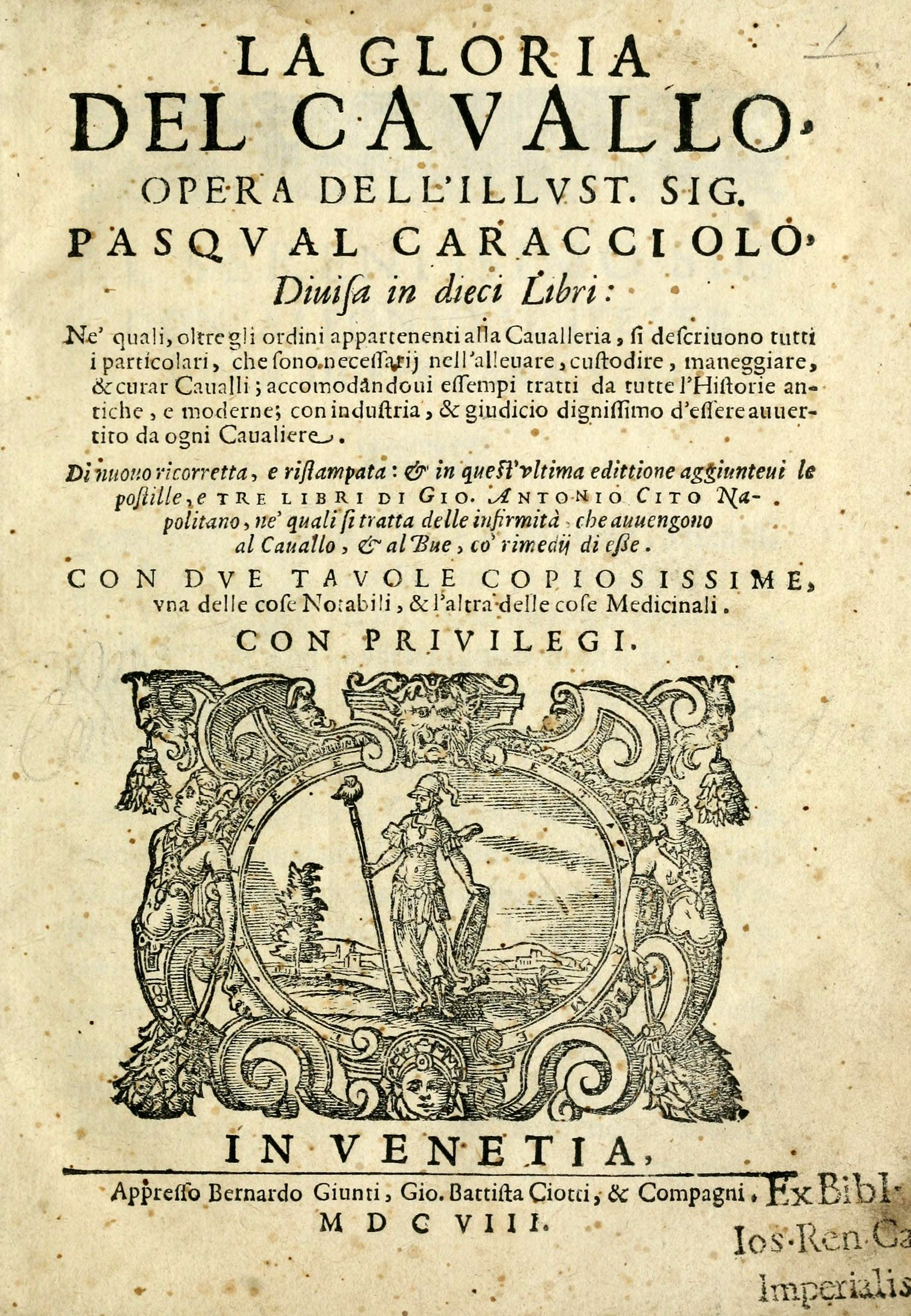
- Title page of the 1608 edition of La Gloria del Cavallo
- Born: Naples
- Other names: Pasqual Caracciolo
- Years active: 1566–1608
- Known for: La Gloria del Cavallo, 1566

Pasquale Caracciolo or Pasqual Caracciolo (floruit 1566–1608) was a Neapolitan nobleman who wrote a substantial treatise on horses and horsemanship. His work La Gloria del Cavallo was first published in 1566. He is also a member of the House of Carácciolo.

== La Gloria del Cavallo ==
La Gloria del Cavallo is a treatise of about a thousand pages, dedicated almost entirely to horses and horsemanship. Caracciolo discusses the correct methods of training horses, but also investigates the complex relationships between horses and people. He attributes to horses feelings comparable to those of humans. His discussion of the character of horses uses examples from the theory of humours as expounded by the second-century Greek physician Galen of Pergamon in relation to human medicine.

The work also contains a chapter on the diseases of cattle.

== Publications ==
- La Gloria del Cavallo (1566). Full text: 1566 edition; 1567 edition; 1608 edition
