= Antoine de Pluvinel =

French riding master

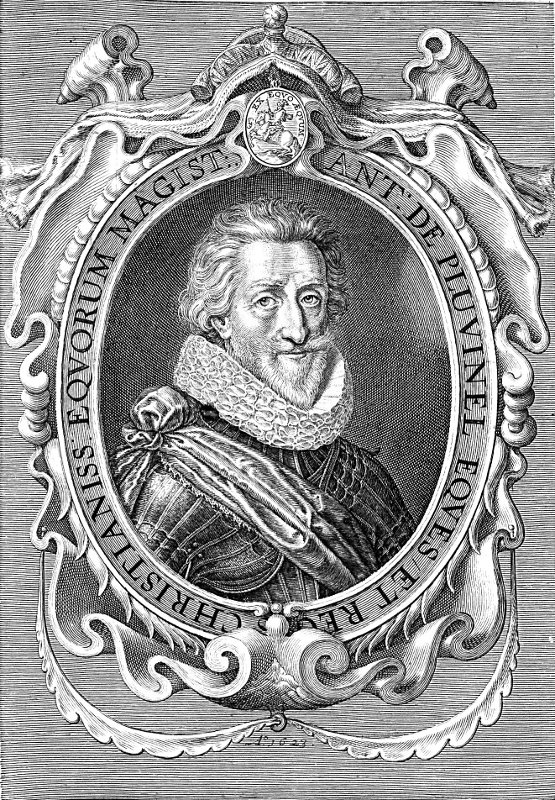
Antoine de Pluvinel, portrait

Antoine de Pluvinel (1552, Crest, Dauphiné - 24 August 1620) was the first of the French riding masters, and has had great influence on modern dressage. He wrote L’Instruction du Roy en l’exercice de monter à cheval ("instruction of the King in the art of riding"), was tutor to King Louis XIII, and is credited with the invention of using two pillars, as well as using shoulder-in to increase suppleness.

== History ==
Antoine de Pluvinel was born in the town of Crest, then in the province of the Dauphiné in France. His date of birth is given as 1552 by Terrebasse, where it is based on the Mémoire of Pluvinel's son-in-law. It is given as 1555 by several other authors including Saurel, Christian, Mennessier, and Monteilhet, which according to Tucker does not coincide with other known details of his life. Antoine de Pluvinel left for Italy at the age of 10 or seventeen to begin studying horsemanship under Giovanni Battista Pignatelli, and trained under him until 1571 or 1572. He then returned to France to study under M. de Sourdis, before becoming the premier ecuyer to the Duc d'Anjou (who would later become Henri III) and accompanying him to his new throne in Poland. After the death of King Charles IX, Henri returned to France, taking Pluvinel with him.

He gave several honors to Pluvinel, continued by his brother-in-law, Henri IV, from 1589, including chamberlain, tutor to the Duc de Vendôme, governor of Grosse Tour de Bourges, and sub-governor to the dauphin Louis (the future Louis XIII) to whom he taught horse-riding. The diary of Jean Héroard (main witness of the childhood of Louis XIII) describes the relationships between the King and his sub-governor.

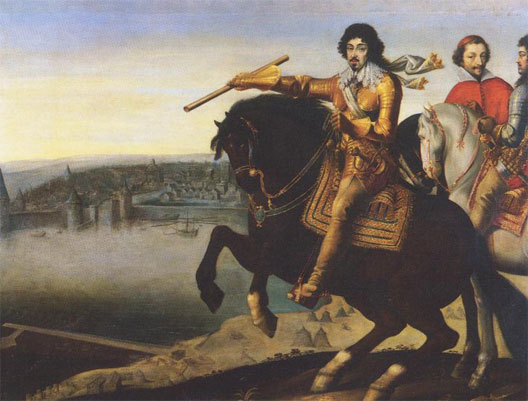
Pluvinel's student, Louis XIII.

In 1594, Pluvinel founded the "Academie d'Equitation" near what is now Place des Pyramides, a long-time dream. There, the French nobility was trained not only in horsemanship, but also in all the accomplishments (dancing, fashionable dressing, etc.) It can be said that Pluvinel's influence on the aristocracy lasted from the late 16th century to the 17th century. Richelieu, the future Prime minister of King Louis XIII attended the Academie; so did William, duke of Cavendish.

Pluvinel died on 24 August 1620, leaving no male heir. His name passed on his nephews La Baume, who were authorized to add Pluvinel to their own name and later became marquesses of la Baume de Pluvinel (1693). The work of the riding academy in Paris was continued by Pluvinel's business partner or manager, Monsieur Benjamin.

Pluvinel's book was published posthumously by the Dutch engraver Crispijn van de Passe the Younger and the royal valet de chambre J.D. Peyrol, first in 1623 under the name Le Maneige Royal, with magnificent engravings, but having never been edited. In 1625 the book was published in its complete form, having been edited by Pluvinel's friend Menou de Charnizay, under its definitive name L'Instruction du Roy en l'exercice de monter à cheval ("Instruction of the King in the exercise of horse riding"). It has since been re-printed several times, and translated into many languages.

== Riding theories ==
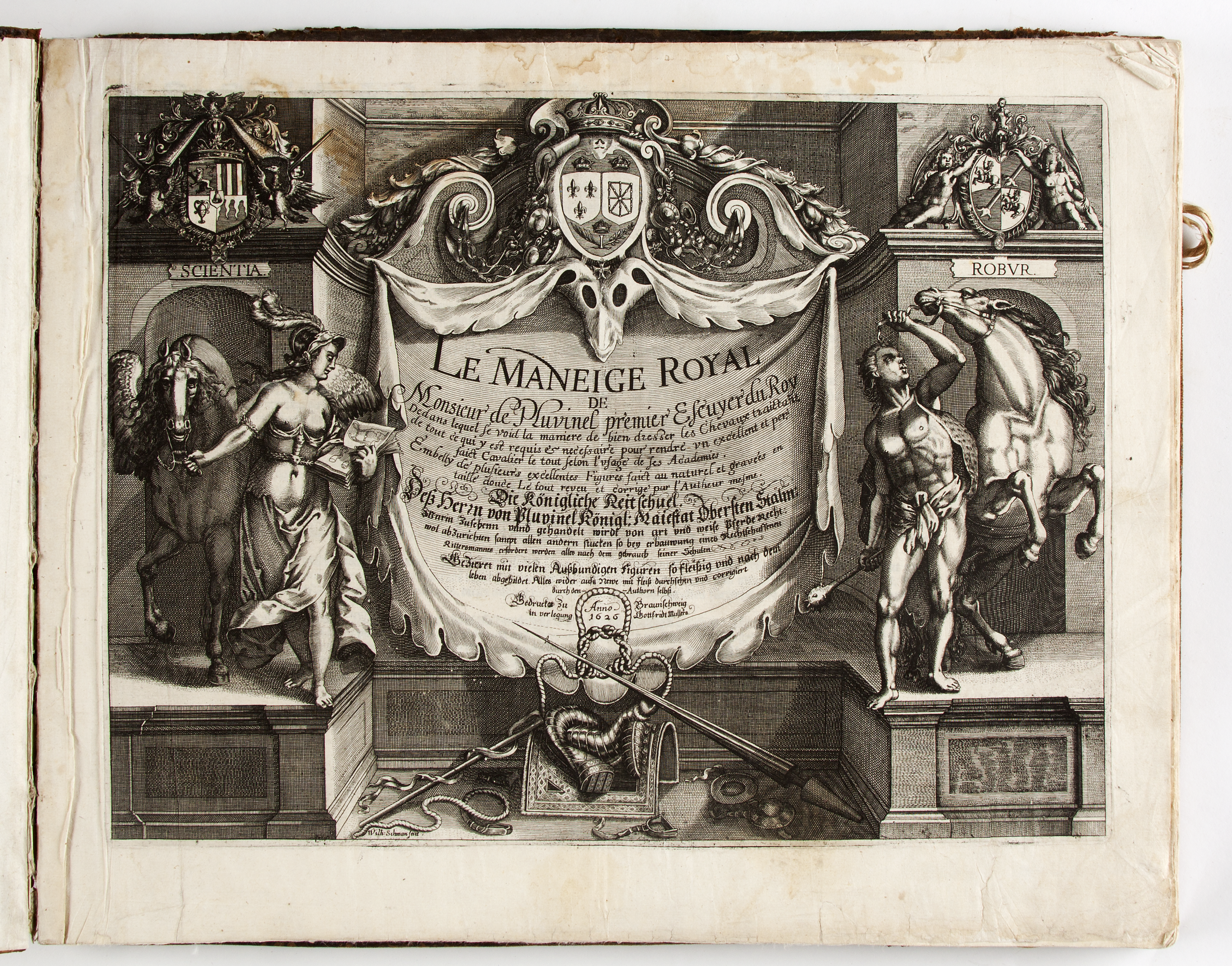
Title-page, 1626.

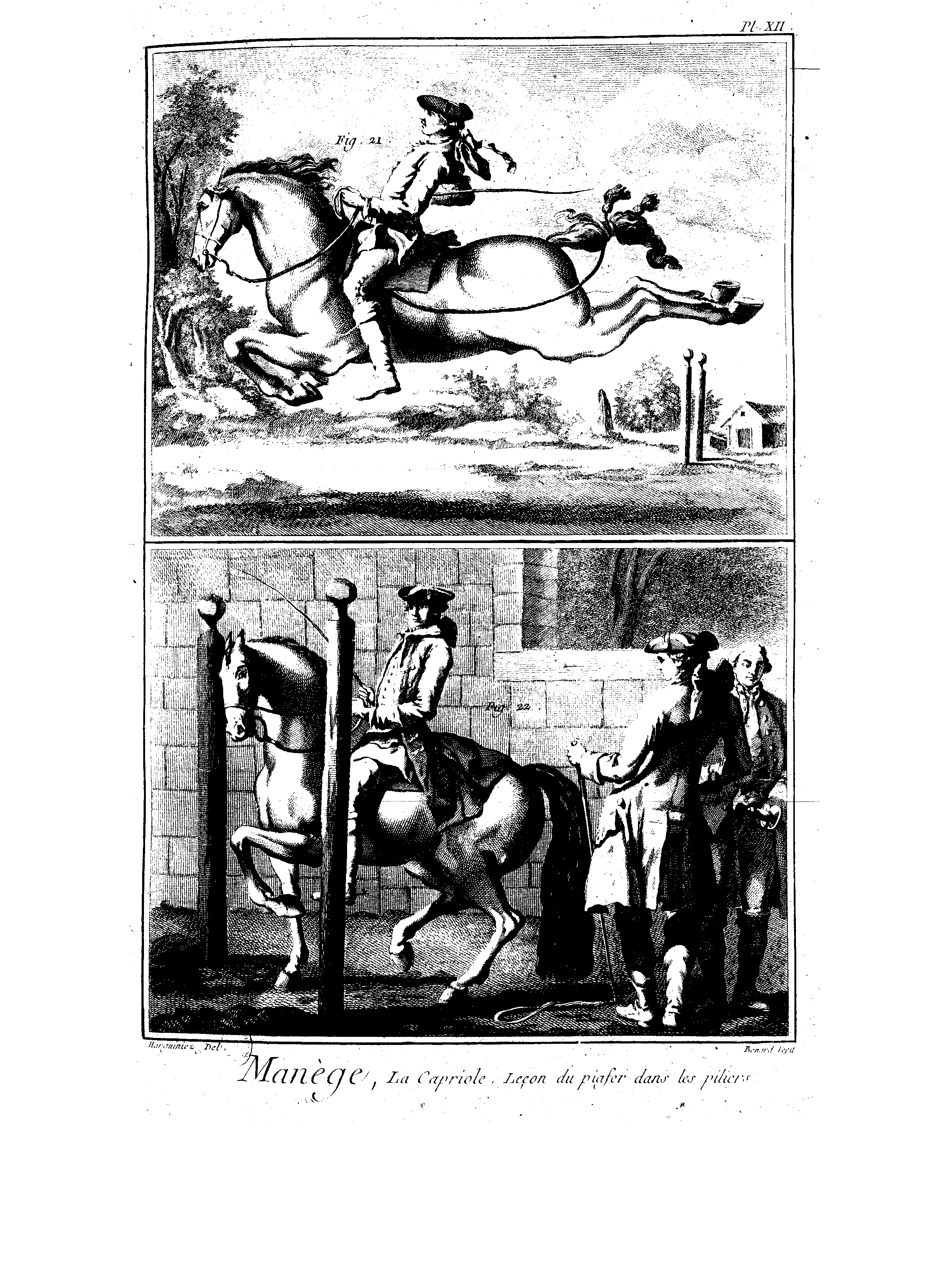
The piaffe between the pillars (below)

Pluvinel is perhaps most well known for his kind, humane training methods. Unlike his Italian teacher Pignatelli, who often used harsh methods to gain obedience from the horse, Pluvinel used praise, careful use of aids, and softer bits (simple curb bits) to get the horse to work with him.

He is also credited with the use of the pillars (wrongly, for La Noue also has record of using them, as does the Greek Eumenes), and he used them extensively in his training of collection and levade. Additionally, he employed the three-track movement, such as shoulder-in, and voltes to supple the horse.

His theories include that the horse must take pleasure in work, due to gentle, understanding riding, and that such a horse will move much more gracefully if he enjoys being ridden.

== Published works ==
- Maneige royal ou l'on peut remarquer le defaut et la perfection du chevalier, en tous les exercices de cet art, digne des princes, fait et pratiqué en l'instruction du Roy, par Antoine Pluvinel, son escuyer principal ... Le tout gravé et représenté en grandes figures de taille-douce par Crispian de Pas ... . Paris: Guillaume le Noir et Melchior Tavernier, 1623.

- 1626 edition.

- L'Instruction du Roy en l'exercice de monter à cheval, par messire Antoine de Pluvinel,... Enrichy de grandes figures en taille-douce... desseignées et gravées par Crispian de Pas le jeune. Paris: Michel Nivelle, 1625.

- another copy
- 1627 edition
- 1629 edition.
