= Equine ethics =

Animal welfare considerations

Equine ethics is a field of ethical and philosophical inquiry focused on human interactions with horses. It seeks to examine and potentially reform practices that may be deemed unethical, encompassing various aspects such as breeding, care, usage (particularly in sports), and end-of-life considerations. Central to this field is the emphasis on respect and the well-being of the horses. Key topics of debate within equine ethics include the slaughter of horses, the consumption of their meat, their legal status, zoophilia, doping in equestrian sports, the retirement of horses post-exploitation, choices regarding euthanasia, and the disposition of a horse's body after death (such as knackery or burial). Additionally, there are societal calls for the recognition of horses as companion animals and increased awareness of their sensitivities.

The discourse surrounding equine ethics is influenced by movements such as veganism and animal rights, which advocate against practices such as slaughter, hippophagy, doping, and zoophilia. These ethical considerations have implications for the economy and legal frameworks surrounding horse riding, racing, and breeding, particularly in the context of globalization and international trade in equestrian sports.

== Definition and issues ==
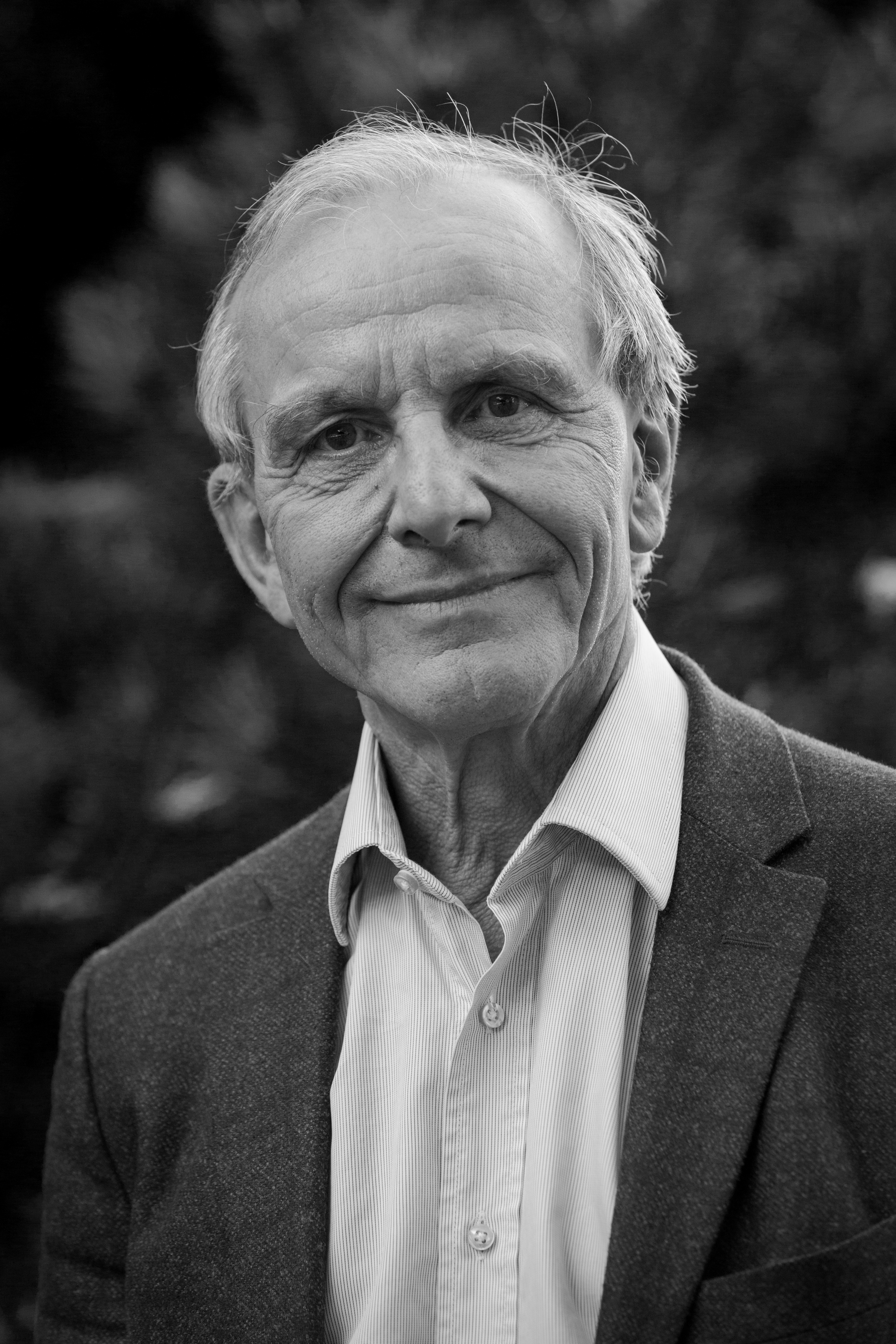
Axel Kahn is one of the personalities involved in promoting more ethical relations with horses.

According to the definition provided by the Swiss National Stud Farm, equine ethics involves critically examining human behavior toward horses to "decide in good conscience what is right and what is wrong, and to act accordingly". This field emphasizes treating horses with respect for their dignity and well-being while also fulfilling the expectations of their utility for humans. The responsibility for ethical treatment primarily falls on individuals who interact closely with horses, including jockeys, owners, breeders, grooms, and therapists. It also encompasses considerations regarding breeding practices, such as the selection of hypertypes.

For a practice to be deemed ethical, it must respect the dignity of the horse. This is determined by ensuring that any imposed restraints are justified by overriding interests. Ethical evaluation involves weighing the hardships faced by the horse against the interests of the involved parties. If the suffering inflicted on the horse outweighs these interests, the practice may be classified as abusive. Ethics towards the horse involves "acquiring knowledge about the animal, developing sensitivity to the dangers horses face, refusing to let ambition and economic interests take over, and respecting the animal's natural aptitudes". According to Jean-Baptiste Jeangène Vilmer, horses are recognized by the scientific community as capable of suffering, often serving as a prominent example in discussions of animal welfare. Geneticist and ethicist Axel Kahn highlights that "a horse's stress is similar to ours", emphasizing their capacity to experience well-being and distress. Horses have always enjoyed a special status among domestic animals, as their use is generally other than for food. However, their living conditions, often characterized by confinement in stalls and social isolation, starkly contrast with their natural habitats. This discrepancy raises important ethical considerations regarding their treatment and welfare.

== Examples of balancing interests ==
Evaluating the various interests involved in ethical reflection allows for a comprehensive analysis of the treatment of horses. For instance, branding, used for horse identification, has been increasingly criticized and is now justified primarily for advertising and marketing purposes, particularly since the advent of microchip implants. As a result, branding has been banned in Germany. The shaving of a horse's whiskers is also considered unethical, since it is justified solely by aesthetic considerations, and causes the horse suffering due to the loss of sensory organs.

== Multiple points of view ==
Defining acceptable and unacceptable practices regarding horse treatment often encounters cultural biases. Different societies and individuals have varying relationships with horses based on their historical and cultural contexts, leading to divergent views on specific practices. The rural exodus and the globalization of equestrian and equine sports pose the problem of finding a consensus. A large number of equestrian practices are deemed unethical, including the use of a harsh bit, the riding crop, training methods such as rollkur and poling, the use of electric shocks, and the domination of the horse by force.

== History ==
Before the establishment of formal animal ethics, certain uses of horses were condemned by religious morality. In the 2nd century, the early Christian theologian Tertullian criticized the "demonic" use of horses in circus games, labeling it a sin for Christians. Historically, both Christianity and Western philosophy positioned horses primarily as servants to humanity. Éric Baratay notes that 18th-century clerics believed that horses were created to carry humans, dogs to provide companionship, and trees to offer shade. The horse has a positive connotation, but Catholic religious morality condemns the act of giving it a burial, an act considered pagan. In India, dharma acts as a kind of code of ethics, promoting non-violent behavior towards animals. Siddhartha Gautama forbade his followers to see an animal slaughtered and to consume the two "royal animals", the elephant and the horse. Moralistic notions of the right way to treat animals do not take into account the pain they may feel. Whether religious or social, this conception persisted until the 1970s.

== Philosophers' opinions since the Renaissance ==
Michel de Montaigne expressed skepticism regarding humanity's claimed "rational" superiority over animals. In contrast, René Descartes formulated the concept of the "animal machine", positing that animals lack reason and speech, thereby categorizing them as mechanistic beings. Immanuel Kant considers that "animals are not conscious of themselves, and are therefore only means to an end [man]". Baruch Spinoza, on the other hand, recognizes that animals possess "a mind" and express certain feelings:

Horse and man, it's true, are both driven by the desire to procreate; but one is a horse's desire, and the other a man's desire. Likewise desires and appetites of insects, fish, and birds must each be different each time.

— Spinoza, Éthique

Similarly, in opposition to Cartesian thought, Jean Meslier writes:

Tell some peasants that their cattle have no life or feelings, that their cows and horses, their sheep and lambs, are only blind machines insensitive to evil, and that they only walk by spring-like machines, and like puppets without seeing or perceiving where they are going. They will certainly laugh at you.

— Jean Meslier, Testament

Michel Onfray analyzes it as one of the first known anti-speciesist texts. Similarly, for Meslier, an open atheist, man, and horse are made of the same stuff: "what the horse is, man is too; what he has been and what he will be after his death too".

== 19th century ==
The utilitarian doctrine of the 19th century significantly challenged the ethical status of horses, prompting a notable shift in Western philosophical thought. Jeremy Bentham asserted that horses possess reasoning abilities that surpass those of human infants and emphasized their capacity for suffering. He stated:

An adult horse or dog is an incomparably more rational animal, and also more talkative, than a child of a day or a week, or even a month. However, supposing otherwise, what use would it be to us? The question is not: can they reason? Nor: can they speak? The question is: Can they suffer?

— Jeremy Bentham

Alberto Bondolfi highlights the importance of Bentham's argument, as it marks the first time pain is used as the ethical criterion for judging the treatment of animals. At the time, consideration for the service rendered "by an old dog or an old horse" was considered a "human duty". Éric Baratay notes that from the latter half of the 19th century, many farmers began to keep their old workhorses "retired" until natural death, opting against slaughter. This shift in practice reflected a growing sentiment against hippophagy, not for religious reasons, but rather because people "couldn't imagine eating their fellow workers".

== Development of animal ethics ==
Animal ethics, as a philosophical discipline, emerged primarily in English-speaking countries during the 1970s, notably with the publication of Peter Singer's Animal Liberation. This development coincided with significant changes in the societal role of horses in Western culture. Historically viewed as agricultural livestock and symbols of military virility, horses have increasingly gained recognition in urban and female circles, evolving into companions regarded as pets deserving of emotional connection. The Swiss National Stud states:

Once an agricultural livestock and a virile military symbol [...], the horse has conquered female and urban circles, gaining the status of a pet with which to converse and to which to bestow feelings.

A growing number of riders claim to love their horses, but anthropomorphism is common. According to Baratay, the horse has become the animal "that's not in the house", a symbol of nature and an ambassador for the younger generation. Jean-Pierre Digard underlines the intensification of the debate, gradually shifting from the notion of "animal protection" (conceived as a human duty) to that of "animal rights", then "animal liberation". Émilie De Cooker notes "a recent evolution in morals towards greater concern for the welfare of horses", which leads to these reflections on equestrian ethics. She believes we need to "formalize these new sensitivities". This evolution raises critical questions regarding the use of reins and the management of horses' end-of-life scenarios.

The ethical debate arrived in Germany with the revelation that the famous trainer Paul Schockemöhle subjected his show jumping horses to poling, prompting the German Equestrian Federation to issue its first ethical principles in the 1990s. Animal ethics came late to the French debate. The humanist heritage has led to a strong anthropocentrism, with the conviction that animals and the environment are at the service of human beings. French-speaking veterinarians and academics have taken an increasing interest in this debate since the beginning of the 21st century. In 2011, the Swiss National Stud considered that equestrian ethics has taken "an important place".

== Actions in favor of equestrian ethics ==
The notion that ethical considerations alone drive progress in horse welfare is often overstated. In reality, significant advancements in equine welfare have primarily resulted from the efforts of activists and public advocacy. In 1991, the Association Éthique du Cheval was founded in Lille by a dozen riders, aiming to combat hippophagy. In 2009, the French Equestrian Federation published the "Charte d'éthique des équipes de France d'équitation", stipulating that "riders must respect and care for their horses". Axel Kahn, former president of Paris-Descartes University, is involved in this debate, notably through the creation of a university diploma incorporating these notions, effective since January 2016. In 2015, veterinarian Vincent Boureau founded the "Equi-Ethic" think tank to promote ethical considerations in equestrian practices.

In Switzerland, the Swiss Federation of Equestrian Sports (FSSE) began examining ethical issues in equestrian sports in 2008. A multidisciplinary dialogue involving breeders, equine owners, and leisure riders was initiated in 2009, culminating in a recognition of the need for improved information, communication, and knowledge transfer. Swiss law introduced the concept of "animal dignity" in 2008, which defines the inherent value of animals and mandates respect in human-animal interactions. This legal framework critiques actions that cause pain, suffering, or anxiety to horses, and prohibits practices that degrade the animal or treat it as a mere object. As a result, Switzerland implemented bans on practices such as shaving whiskers, hyperflexion (rollkur), martingales in show jumping competitions, and poling between 2014 and 2015.

The Fédération Équestre du Québec has adopted a "Code of Ethics" that includes recommendations for dealing with horses, who should be treated with "the kindness, respect, and compassion they deserve". However, the Galahad Association believes that Quebec regulations lag far behind those in Switzerland. Similarly, Cheval Savoir magazine has pointed out that France lags behind Switzerland in terms of equine protection.

In 2010, Australian researchers Bidda Jones and Paul D. McGreevy published an article committed to "ethical horsemanship", pointing out that "laws are unlikely to adequately protect horse welfare if they regard traditional practices, including the use of riding crops to speed up horses, as 'reasonable' and 'acceptable' without considering their effect".

== Ethical controversies ==
The concept of equestrian ethics is largely rooted in Western philosophical frameworks, which can lead to conflicts with differing cultural perceptions of animals. For example, in the 2010s, countries such as Switzerland, Belgium, and France criticized the practices of Gulf Arab nations in the equestrian discipline of endurance racing, citing the high number of horse fatalities during and after competitions. Yves Riou noted that these incidents reflect a shift in the status of horses in the Middle East, where they have increasingly been viewed as replaceable commodities.

A notable ethical controversy arose in 2015 when a young Swedish rider made headlines for euthanizing her mare, which was suffering from an incurable knee condition, and consuming the animal's meat for several months. She publicly defended her decision on social media, arguing that it would be illogical to waste 154 kg of meat when it could be consumed rather than purchased from a store. Her actions sparked significant backlash online, with critics accusing her of barbarity and likening her decision to eating a dog or a family member. In response to the outrage, she reiterated her belief that it was "fair" to eat an animal that had lived a good life, emphasizing her perspective on the ethics of using the animal's remains.

== Legal aspects ==
The treatment of horses can vary significantly in terms of legal and ethical standards, influenced by cultural practices and societal norms. While some behaviors towards horses are legally condemned, others may not be, highlighting the complexity of equine ethics across different contexts. Training courses that take into account the notion of ethics vis-à-vis the horse within the framework of the law are beginning to appear in response to societal demand. At the end of 2015, Paris-Descartes University, in partnership with the Haras de la Cense stud farm, created a university diploma titled "Ethics, Welfare and the Law of the Horse". In 2020, France experienced a troubling series of horse and donkey mutilations, which further underscored the need for enhanced awareness and regulation surrounding animal welfare practices.

== Legal status of the horse ==
=== Property ===
In many jurisdictions, domestic horses are classified as movable property, meaning they are owned by individuals and can be relocated as desired. This legal framework grants owners significant rights regarding their horses, including the right to euthanize them, provided the actions comply with the law. For example, an employee of an equine slaughterhouse in New Mexico, angered by threats from conservation groups, published a video in which he shot his horse with a pistol, and was not convicted. In certain countries, such as France and Switzerland, horse owners can opt to exclude their horses from slaughter for human consumption. However, this choice is frequently contested by the horse meat industry.

The ethical debate surrounding the treatment of horses has sparked calls for a reevaluation of their legal status. Critics argue that classifying horses as movable property diminishes their status as sentient beings. Since the 2000s, both Germany and Austria have amended civil law to clarify that animals, including horses, are neither "things" nor mere objects. In France, horses are still recognized as property, but the Civil Code, the Rural Code, and the Penal Code have recognized their sentient nature since 2015. The existence of a legal status for horses enables legal protection, not least because it provides a framework for procedures in the event of abuse or theft. Horses that have no legal status because they belong to no one, such as Australia's Brumbies, are not protected in any way and can be legally slaughtered or poisoned by anyone. This aspect motivated the creation of a legal status for American Mustangs, which is illegal to mistreat or kill under the Wild and Free-Roaming Horses and Burros Act of 1971.

=== Livestock or pet? ===
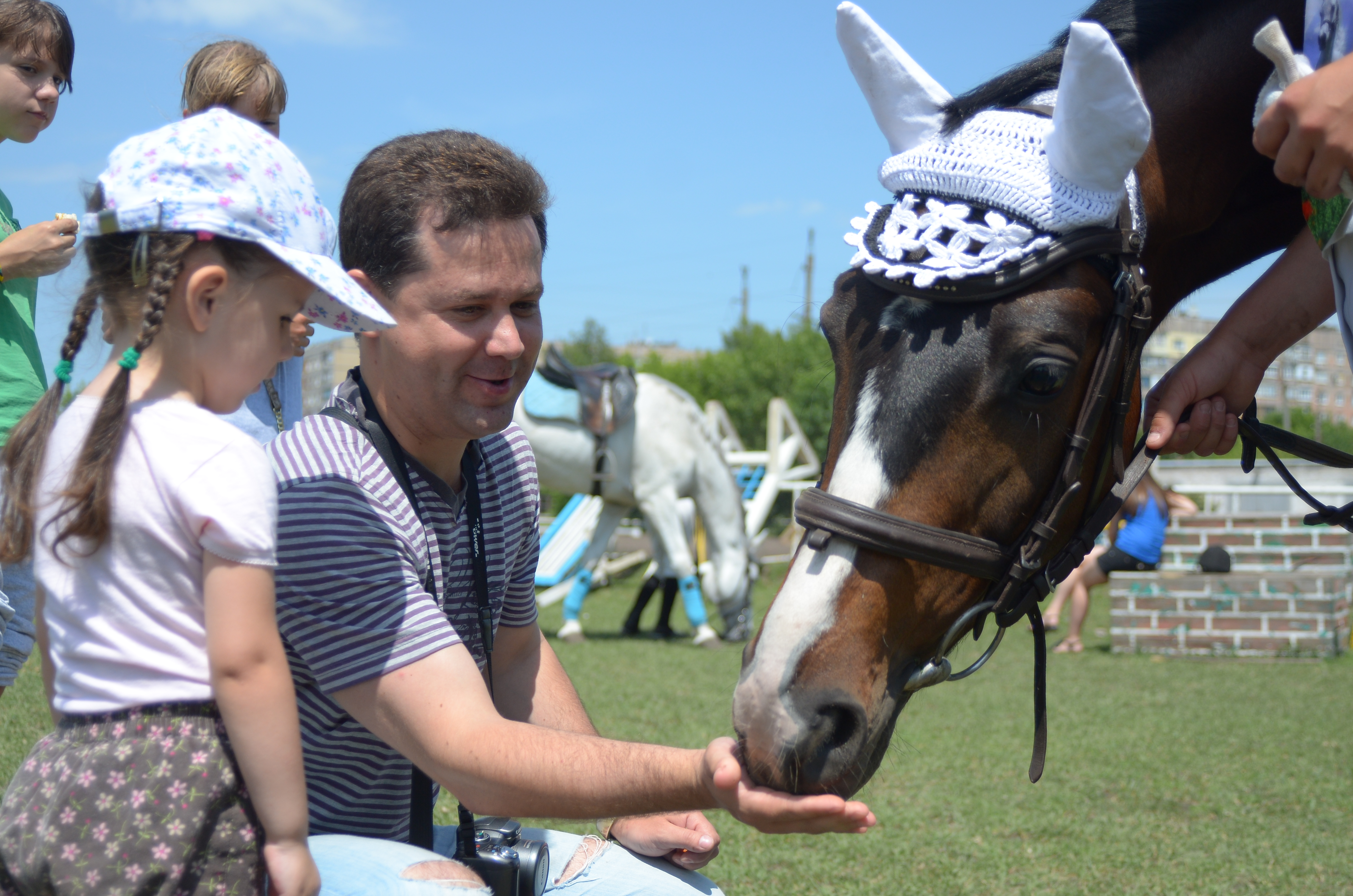
Horses are increasingly seen as pets.

Traditionally viewed and utilized solely as livestock, horses now occupy a complex position between livestock and pets, particularly in regions such as France, Quebec, Switzerland, and Belgium. In Belgium, Quebec, and France, the horse is still legally classified as a livestock animal, despite repeated requests (from the Brigitte Bardot Foundation, among others) for it to be granted pet status, which would abolish the horse-breeding industry. According to an IFOP poll in March 2013, 64% of French people support this change in the horse's legal status. In Switzerland, horse owners have a choice of legal status for their animals, depending on their activity. A horse intended for food production is a livestock animal, while a leisure horse that is not intended for slaughter is a pet excluded for life from the food chain, the choice being final.

The generalization of pet status for all horses would have consequences for the animal's possible uses. Under European Union law, a pet animal may not be "trained in a way that is detrimental to its health or well-being, in particular by forcing it to exceed its natural abilities or strength, or by using artificial means". This would open up a legal avenue to prohibit the use of devices such as riding crops, spurs, and bits.

=== Doping ===
The doping of horses in competitive sports has been documented since ancient times and is considered "one of the most worrying excesses of the sporting spectacle". The financial stakes and potential rewards associated with winning can lead to neglect of ethical considerations and the welfare of the animal involved. Doping practices are widely condemned as contrary to the principles of sport, which hold that only healthy horses should compete. The way in which doping is detected varies from one country to another. In equestrian sport, doping control is based on a well-established organization. The lack of resources limits controls, but they do have a positive influence on amateur riders tempted to self-medicate their horses. For Jean-Baptiste Jeangène Vilmer, doping a horse should be re-qualified as poisoning, to emphasize the animal's non-consent, unlike doping human athletes.

=== Zoophilia ===
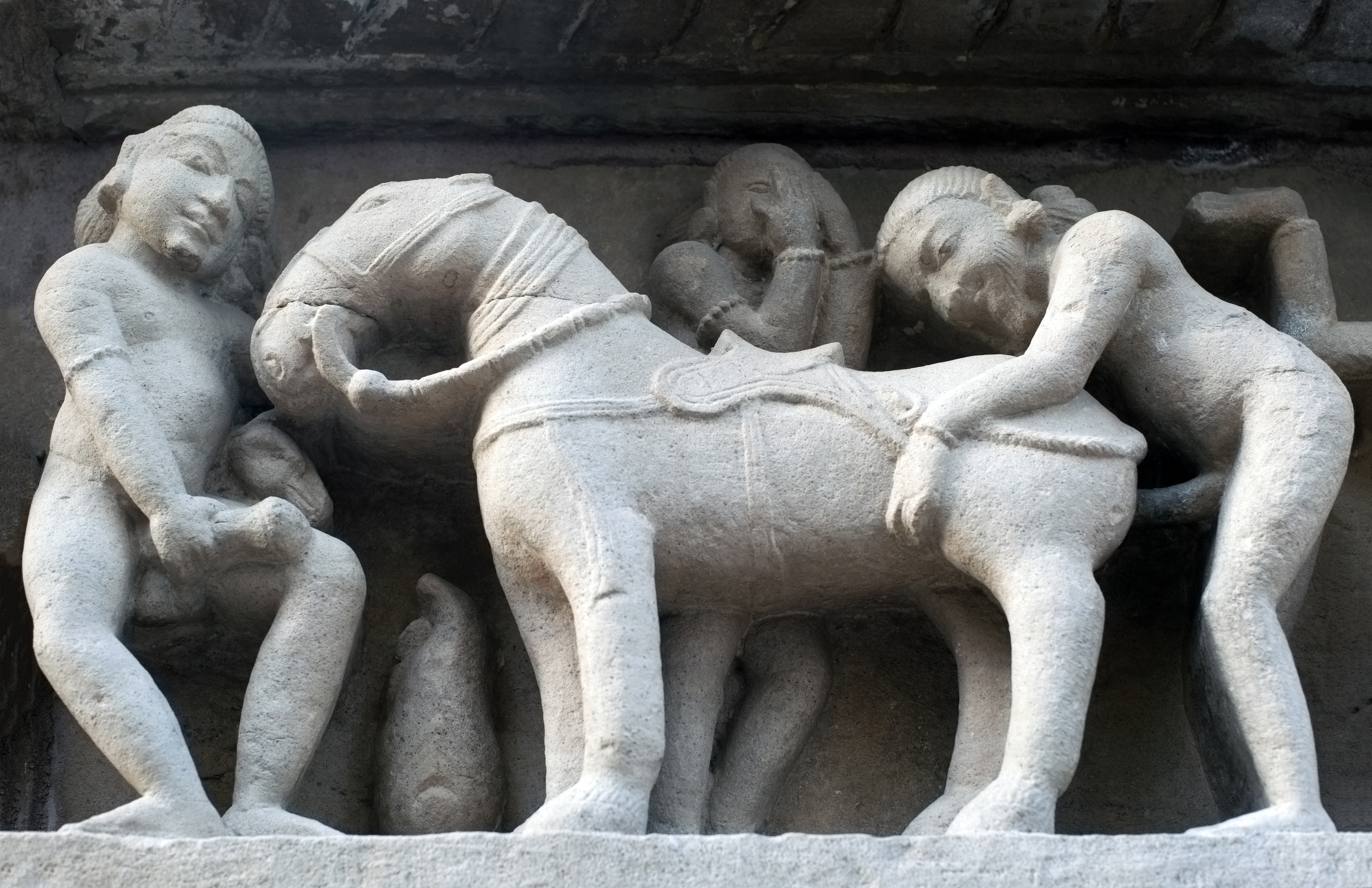
Sculpture of a man having sexual relations with a mare while another masturbates; outside the Lakshmana Hindu temple in Khajurâho

Zoophilia with horses has always existed since they are one of the "animals to which people have access". This practice is often "swept under the carpet". Experts generally acknowledge the animal's non-consent and suffering. In the 1990s, Usenet users who identified themselves as "zoophiles" grouped together in the alt.sex.bestiality newsgroup, recounting their sexual acts with, among others, horses. In Switzerland, horses are particularly popular with zoophiles: in 2014, 9.4% of horse abuse cases involved zoophilic acts, a higher rate than for other animal species. In the same country, actual convictions are rare. The revelation of this figure led to a bad buzz against the Swiss. Convictions following sexual practices with horses exist in several countries, including Italy, France, Germany and the USA. Not all legislations condemn these sexual acts with an animal, as witnessed in 2005 by the case of Kenneth Pinyan, who died after being sodomized by a stallion in Washington State. The person who had offered him this service was not convicted of zoophilia, as the practice was not penalized in the state at the time. In France, in the same year, a man was convicted of having sexual relations with his pony.

Vinciane Despret raises the legal contradictions of the penalization of zoophilia, and the tendency to re-penalize sexual relations with animals. Article 521.1 of the French Civil Code condemns sexual relations with one's animal on the grounds of serious abuse but does not condemn the slaughtering and eating of one's horse. Furthermore, categorization as movable property does not allow the notion of consent to the sexual act to be legally invoked, since the owner of the movable property legally consents in place of his property. Inclusion of the notion of consent in the judgment of acts of zoophilia or doping would call into question all other uses to which the horse does not consent (such as equestrian sport, equestrian sport...).

=== Status of artist horses ===
The question of whether a horse involved in the creation of an artistic work can benefit from it has been raised: an American horse named Cholla died in 2013 after creating abstract paintings, some worth several thousand euros. As copyright is designed to protect an intentionally created "work of the mind", animals cannot theoretically benefit from it, at least until the intentionality of the act of creation can be established. Alexandre Zollinger has suggested an "interest in kind" for "animal creations" materialized by a contract managed by a collecting society, with the aim of improving the well-being of the animal and its fellow creatures. This type of contract could be applied to horses used in circuses or those involved in filming films and series.

== Philosophical aspects ==
The relationship between humans and horses presents numerous philosophical questions. Some radical proponents of "animal liberation" argue that animals should never be considered property, contending that ownership inherently denies them intrinsic value. In contrast, many horse owners who utilize their animals for work, sport, or leisure acknowledge their intrinsic worth. Equestrian sports often face significant ethical scrutiny, particularly concerning the issues prevalent in high-level competitions. However, the "ordinary, banal, less visible practices" of "Sunday riders" are, according to ethicist Émilie De Cooker, "just as problematic", as are those in riding schools, where horses become "jaded" by being ridden by beginners and repeating the same exercises every day. Competitions for beginner riders frequently feature "tense, poorly muscled horses" alongside riders who, in their attempts to address issues, may resort to inappropriate or even violent methods. While leisure horses often experience pain more frequently than those competing at elite levels, this suffering tends to be less visible and less reported in public discourse.

=== Objectification ===
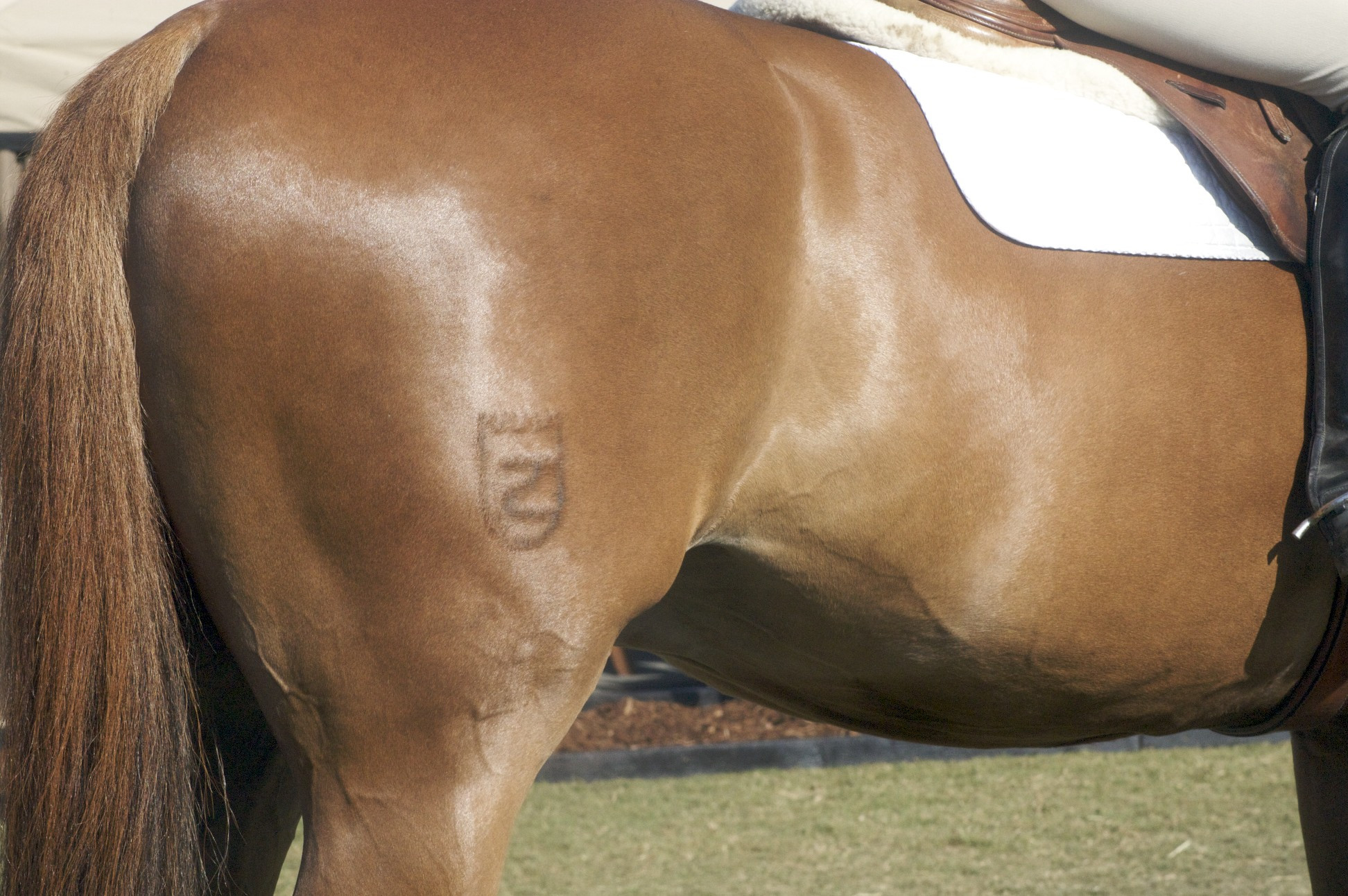
Branding reflects the objectification of the horse as a marketing medium (here, the Zangersheide brand)

Certain legal practices degrade the horse to the status of a "product" or marketing medium, and are referred to as objectification or commodification. For Émilie De Cooker, the sport horse is considered an object. These practices have been compared to the slave trade by the animal liberation movement, particularly with regard to branding. While the widespread adoption of microchip implants has rendered traditional branding largely obsolete, it persists primarily as a custom and a means of promoting specific breeds or bloodlines. The horse has uniquely become a living medium for sponsorship; for example, Swedish rider Malin Baryard-Johnsson named one of her mounts H&M Tornesch. It is increasingly common for sports horses to feature brand or company names as part of their names, such as La Biosthetique Sam and Jappeloup de Luze. Traditionally, sport horses bear the name of their original stud, but they are sometimes renamed after a sale: the mare Silvana de Hus (of de Hus stud farm) became Silvana*HDC after her purchase by the Haras des Coudrettes stud in 2012. The stallion Vleut has been renamed Guccio by his rider Edwina Tops-Alexander, to reinforce her partnership with the luxury brand Gucci. Such practices can lead to legal disputes regarding trademark law, exemplified by a 2013 case involving the horse Jappeloup, which saw its name registered as a trademark, resulting in conflicts over its usage by various individuals and companies.

Amélie Tsaag Valren highlights that the vocabulary used by breeders and cloning practices reflect a significant "desacralization" of the horse. On many farms, the term "product of the year" refers to a foal born that year. The Zangersheide stud farm, which uses horse cloning, orders several clones of the same animal from a laboratory to be used as breeding stock. They give them the name of the original, followed by a letter of the Greek alphabet to differentiate them. For example, the mare Ratina Z has three clones named Ratina Z alpha, Ratina Z beta, and Ratina Z gamma.

The notion of degradation of the animal, used in Swiss law, applies regardless of whether the horse is aware of its status as an object—such as being named after a sponsor or subjected to a comical grooming style. This concept is grounded in the perspective of the human responsible for the horse's treatment, specifically whether they regard the animal as an object rather than a sentient being.

=== Instrumentalization ===
The instrumentalization of horses is a pervasive aspect of the equestrian world, as humans continually determine their use and purpose. This phenomenon is evident not only in competitive equestrian sports but also in leisure riding, where horses are often treated as tools by inexperienced riders. Such riders may resort to harsh measures when their mounts fail to comply, frequently due to their own mistakes rather than the horse's behavior. This "instrumentalization for pleasure or ego" reflects a self-centered approach, indicating an "absolute domination of humans over nature and the living beings that surround them". The word "submission" recurs frequently in equestrian vocabulary, for example in the scoring criteria for dressage competitions. According to psychoanalyst Ghilaine Jeannot-Pages, "the entire sporting vocabulary serves this lure", whereas the psychology of a herbivorous herd animal would lead it to flee constraints and useless efforts.

Further questions about instrumentalization arise in the context of horse castration versus the keeping of stallions. Castration poses risks to the horse's physical integrity and can lead to veterinary complications; however, it is often justified as a means to ease management and reduce behavioral challenges associated with maintaining stallions. While Muslim countries typically oppose animal castration on ethical grounds, the practice is sometimes questioned in Western contexts as well. The management of stallions presents its own set of challenges, including issues of competence and potential legal complications. Additionally, an uncastrated male horse deprived of reproductive opportunities may experience sexual frustration. A careful assessment of the pros and cons is essential for making an informed ethical decision regarding castration.

Some horses are subject to "excessive care" such as clipping feathering, clipping ear hair, neck and mane, and frequent shampooing.

=== Eugenics and selective breeding ===
The world of equestrian sport is by its very nature eugenicist, as it focuses solely on performance. The least adapted animals are excluded from reproduction and retired, including by sale to the slaughterhouse. Albert Jacquard notes that horse breeding is traditionally described as "improving the horse breed". However, this term can be misleading, as it suggests a definitive process of enhancement. The vast array of qualities in horses makes it difficult to establish a clear hierarchy of traits; determining which characteristics are most valuable requires subjective judgment. In practice, breeding tends to focus on enhancing specific traits that are deemed beneficial for human purposes, such as speed and jumping ability. Similarly, the use of artificial insemination in breeding can lead to a reduction in the genetic diversity of horses through the use of the same stallions, which is unethical.

== Position statements ==
The debate surrounding equine welfare has attracted the attention of various researchers, philosophers, veterinarians, associations, and interest groups. Ethicist Axel Kahn emphasizes the importance of respecting nature and considering the well-being of horses. Ethicist Émilie De Cooker believes that the trend towards greater consideration for equine well-being needs to be accompanied "in order to amplify it". She supports a change in the regulations and laws governing the equestrian sport, and therefore the means to achieve it, as was the case in eventing, where the dangerous nature of the obstacles caused the death of many horses: "It would be pointless to try to ban equestrian competitions or, for extremists, horse riding". Taking into account the contributions of natural horsemanship would make it possible to "avoid certain forms of constraint and promote easier collaboration between horse and human". She advises taking inspiration from Nuno Oliveira's equestrian philosophy, which rejects arrogance and domination, and encouraging the education of riders towards "a form of wisdom and humility". For Dr. Bernard Denis, veterinarian and president of the Society of Ethnozoology, "Removing horses from the real or potential suffering associated with their sometimes abusive or disrespectful use, and improving equine welfare from now on, remains a priority". He envisages the creation of a breeding and possession permit to achieve this goal.

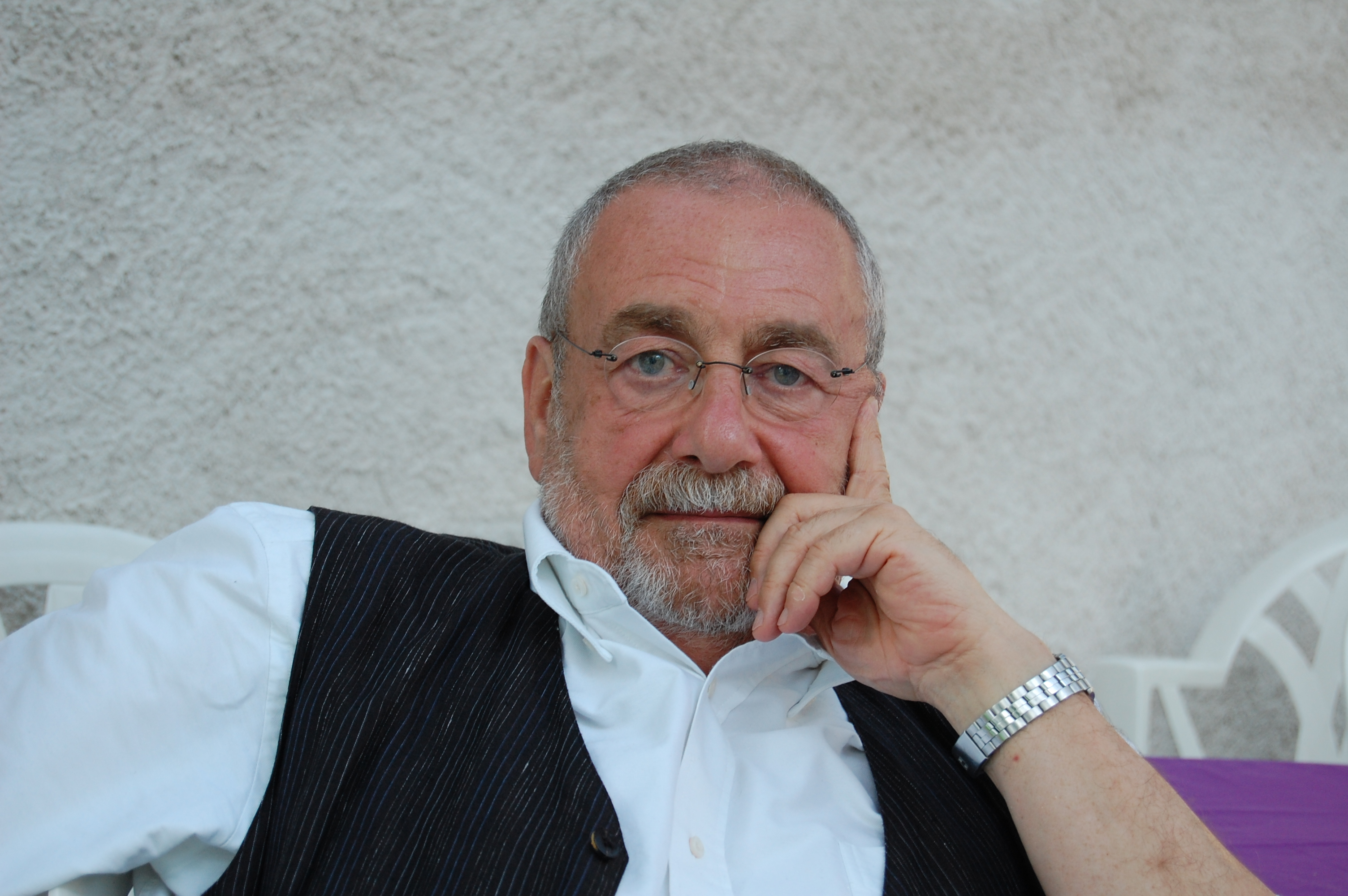
Jean-Pierre Digard advocates the "intensive use" of horses, and the "right of humans to raise and use animals".

In contrast, ethnologist Jean-Pierre Digard takes a speciesist stance, arguing that treating horses as "babies" is more detrimental than practices like bullfighting. He critiques the concept of keeping "garden horses", or unused animals, suggesting that this approach could lead to extinction or a decline in horse breeds. Digard contends that the desire to protect horses can lead to an extremist, anti-humanist perspective. Commenting on the theory that the horse will disappear due to lack of use, Amélie Tsaag Valren and Laetitia Bataille support a "third way between the end of all use and intensive use, that of a better-understood equitation", taking into account the principles of lightness and biomechanics.

The Swiss National Stud Farm maintains that the principles of horse domestication and use are ethically acceptable, arguing that while there are constraints on the animal—such as restricted movement and obedience to humans—horses also benefit from domestication through care, feeding, and protection from predators.

=== Opinions of the antispeciesist movements ===
The vegan and animal liberation movements advocate an end to animal exploitation and believe a horse should never be "yoked to a human being". Considered "radical currents of animal ethics", they call for an end to the use of animals for sport, and a halt to all domestication processes, whether in meat or pet farming. According to this ideology, owning a domesticated horse and "using" it is tantamount to depriving it of "its own animal existence" and would therefore be ethically reprehensible. Several representatives of the vegan movement have expressed their rejection of horse riding, arguing that horses don't need to be ridden and that horse-riding exists solely for the entertainment of human beings: they advise interacting with the animal solely on foot. On the other hand, animal protection associations that promote veganism, such as L214 and PETA, which claim three million members, are naturally opposed to the slaughter and consumption of horses. PETA has, however, taken a stand in favor of the return of equine slaughter in the United States, due to the increased suffering of unwanted horses exported to Canada and Mexico.

Within the debate on speciesism and as a "useful" domestic animal, the horse, like the dog and cat, enjoys a privileged status compared to other animals. Many philosophers and writers, such as Goethe, have ranked horses among the most valuable animals, right after human beings. Many people believe that we should be indebted: "it would be horrible to kill racehorses because they had previously served us loyally, just as it would be abject to abandon one's faithful dog". The animal liberation movement "demands equal consideration of the interests of all beings with interests, independently of any idea of contract or reciprocity". Speciesism is prevalent even within the equidae family: the horse is the object of a great deal of attention, while the donkey and its hybrids are considered poor animals, and do not give rise to any ethical debate.

=== On slaughtering and hippophagy ===
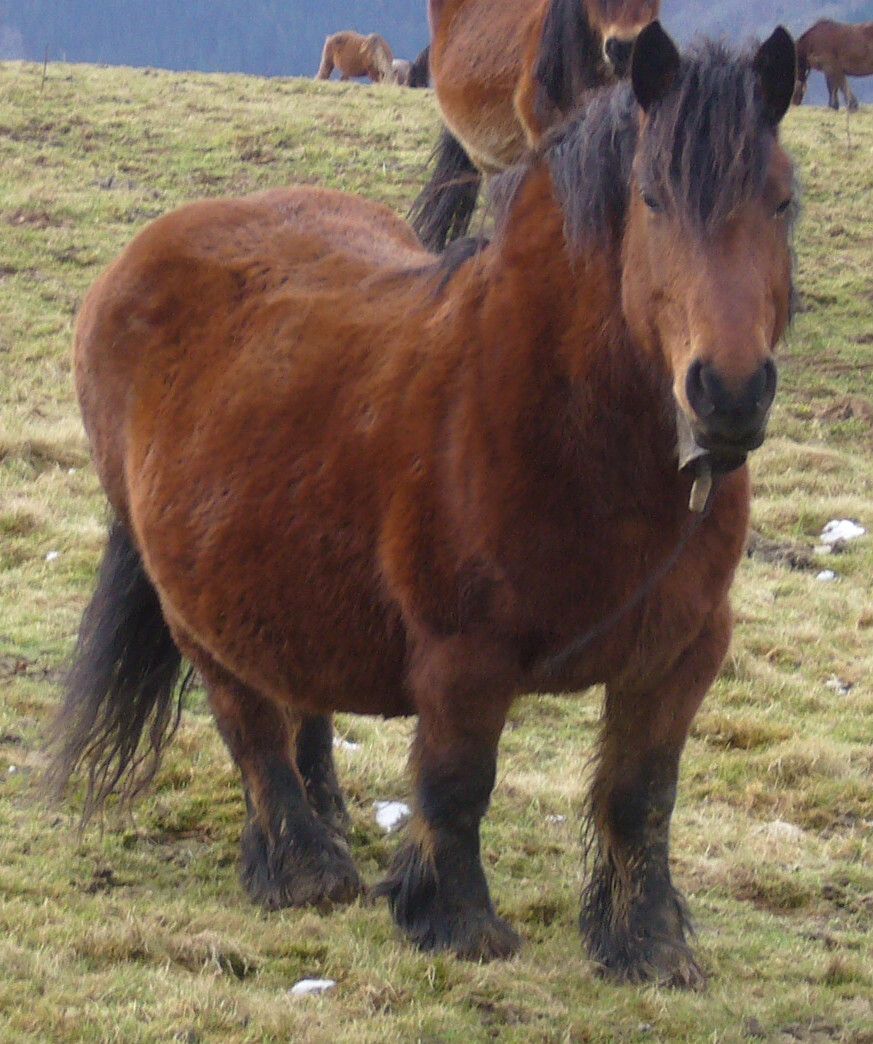
Heavy Basque mountain horse, hypertyped for meat production.

Most animal protection associations and shelters for retired or mistreated horses speak out against slaughter and hippophagy. The Society for the Protection of Animals (SPA by its acronym in French) has called on French supermarkets and hypermarkets to remove horse meat from their shelves because of "the brutality of transport and the state in which horses arrive at the slaughterhouse". The Fondation Brigitte-Bardot, the 30 Millions d'amis Foundation, and the association éthique du cheval in Lille actively campaign against hippophagy. The Swiss association Le Refuge de Darwyn denounces mistreatment in slaughterhouses. The Quebec association Galahad "believes that horses should not be slaughtered for their meat, but that at the end of their lives, they should be euthanized under the supervision of a veterinarian". She adds that, at the very least, measures should be taken to ensure that slaughter takes place without suffering. Roly Owens, President of World Horse Welfare, does not speak out against slaughter or hippophagy but points out that many slaughterhouses have practices that run counter to horse welfare, and that this legitimizes the fight of animal protection associations.

The Swiss National Stud Farm's study concludes that slaughter with a captive bolt pistol is a "good death", as long as it is carried out correctly. However, the related actions can cause distress, such as during "loading, transport, unloading, smells, noise, sometimes waiting at the slaughterhouse, a narrow corridor and a stunning box unsuited to equids", as well as by "misses on the fatal blow", as Temple Grandin pointed out.

From an antispeciesist point of view, the fight against hippophagy alone is an aberration: it should be extended to the fight against all meat consumption. Commenting on the Brigitte Bardot Foundation's shock campaigns, David Olivier points out that "it may save a few horses, but how many more chickens will be killed?".

Through the voice of its president, the French equine veterinary association came out in favor of the slaughter of horses at the end of their lives, in 2014. The Welfare and Behavior Commission disassociated itself from this position in 2015. Axel Kahn declared himself "allergic to hippophagy" and "horrified at the idea of one of his mares ending up with a knife". Several personalities from the equestrian world have come out in favor of hippophagy, often on the grounds of safeguarding Heavy horses. Bartabas made a shock declaration: "If you love horses, eat them!". Jean-Pierre Digard also believes that certain breeds will disappear without hippophagy. Lawyers Claire Bobin and Charles Dudognon point out that it is important to consider the survival of these breeds thanks to the meat industry. Amélie Tsaag Valren points out that the adaptation of these heavy breeds to the meat market has led to a drift in selection criteria, resulting in horses suffering from health problems due to obesity and repeated pregnancies.

In analyzing this debate, Éric Baratay believes that the rejection of slaughter and hippophagy will win out hands down, as the vision of the horse as a livestock animal tends to disappear and concern only the older generations, while "natural horsemanship" and the desire to forge a strong bond with the animal have great success among young people.

=== On retirement ===
Most animal protection associations, such as the Society for the Protection of Animals, want horses to be able to enjoy a retirement after their exploitation in equestrian, equine or breeding activities. Axel Kahn supports the idea that "a fraction of the equine industry's profits should be used to finance places where horses can end their lives". A growing number of veterinarians are investing in "equine geriatrics" to meet the needs of owners of older horses. Pension-retirement facilities for horses exist in France, Belgium and Switzerland. The development of pension-retraite runs the risk of incompetent people offering poorly supervised services. The change in the horse's rhythm needs to be thought both ethically and practically, as the transition from intensive use to a total absence of use and contact with humans could generate unease. Moreover, the question of the horse's affect remains unresolved.

In 1990, V. Chevalier's study highlighted horse retirement as a reason for giving up riding: "having retired their first horse, they [owner-riders] have to maintain it by doing nothing, and find it financially impossible to buy a second one. Most of these riders therefore give up riding [...]".

=== On euthanasia and knackery ===
For some horse owners, the animal's death is the culmination of a production cycle, while for others it represents a heavy emotional loss. The latter wish to have a choice in the destination of their animal's body after its death, other than a slaughterhouse. Depending on the owner's wishes and local legislation, this choice may be knackery, burial or cremation. In France, only knackery is legal, as incineration is not available throughout the country. Axel Kahn denounces this compulsory "racket", and would like to see an opportunity to discuss the legalization of horse burial with public authorities. In the UK, horse burial is legal. In Scotland and Wales, only "pet" horses may be buried.

Several vets have weighed in on the "best way" to put a horse to death. AVEF member Claire Scicluna argues that slaughter is better than euthanasia, saying she doesn't want healthy horse owners to go to vets to have their animals euthanized because they can't afford to maintain them. Euthanasia entails constraints, as the veterinarian must master the technique to offer a suffering-free death. Its impact on the environment is considered harmful, as is that of incineration.

== On objectification, domination and the economic model ==
For Émilie De Cooker, "the objectification of the competition horse and the prior denial of its status as a moral subject stem from a reductionist conception of animal existence": this leads to a lack of consideration for its well-being, the use of painful methods to increase performance, and the primacy of financial interest over ethics, for example in the early backing of thoroughbreds at 18 months. She wishes to "encourage the creation of a type of riding, and equestrian sports, in which domination has no place. To think and practice a form of horsemanship that does not rely on the horse's inability to rebel, but instead allows it to express itself as an intelligent and sensitive being":

When you dominate a horse the way you dominate an object, or the way you think you dominate the world, the relationship thus established does not allow for the expression of an ethical concern for your horse's well-being.

— Émilie De Cooker

Jean-Jacques Gouguet, a PhD in economics, believes that the liberal-productivist model, which favors practices such as cloning and doping, bears witness to the fact that the equestrian sporting spectacle has reached a "total impasse": "eventually, we'll have to put in place an alternative model based on a shift away from economics". On the newspaper Le Monde, Henri Seckel opposed the renaming of living beings for sponsorship "in the name of money", and testifies to the pressure exerted by companies on journalists to use the sponsor's name when writing sports articles.

== On cloning ==
Horse cloning involves bioethical issues, since it leads to a high mortality rate of embryos, fetuses and newborn or young foals, as well as contributing to commodification. For these reasons, the Swiss National Stud concluded that "in the current state of knowledge, the use of horse cloning is ethically unjustifiable ". In the UK, the researcher William (Twink) Allen was refused permission to continue his cloning trials in 2004, as the animals could present malformations, anomalies and diseases, according to the British authorities. Dr Natasha Lane, of the Society for the Prevention of Cruelty to Animals (RSPCA), said it was not acceptable to clone horses "just to get a gold medal ". Allen spoke out against this decision, believing that the British government had "caved in to the animal rights lobby ". According to various surveys, including one carried out by Cheval Savoir in 2009, horse cloning is generally poorly accepted by riders and professionals. For French scientist Éric Palmer, the technique is "demonized" due to misunderstandings. The American Quarter Horse Association has stated that "[...] clones have no parents, cloning is not breeding. It's just photocopies of the same horse", pointing to its low success rate and the risk of developing yet unknown genetic disorders. The Jockey Club also strongly opposed. Dr Thomas Reed, who owns the private stud farm Morningside Stud in Ireland (where Hickstead was born), publicly opposed cloning after the accidental death of his stallion in competition at the end of 2011.

Émilie De Cooker notes that, according to the cloning company Cryozootech, "the absence of animal suffering and the naturalness of gestation seem to be enough to end the debate on the legitimacy of this practice". It sees "the adoption of cloning as a breeding method in its own right as a sign of the trivialization of the relationship of commodification that man has established with the horse".

== See also ==
- Horse welfare reforms
- Society for the Protection of Animals
- French Equestrian Federation

== Bibliography ==
- Jones, Bidda; McGreevy, Paul D. (2010). "Ethical equitation: Applying a cost-benefit approach". Journal of Veterinary Behavior. 5 (4): 196–202. doi:10.1016/j.jveb.2010.04.001.
- Bobin, Claire; Dudognon, Charles (2012). "Le cheval de compétition: entre contrats et lois" [The competition horse: between contracts and laws] (PDF). Revue Semestrielle de Droit Animalier (in French). Archived from the original (PDF) on 11 June 2017.
- Bondolfi, Alberto (1995). L'homme et l'animal [Man and animal] (in French). Saint-Paul. ISBN 2-8271-0697-3.
- De Cooker, Émilie (2012). "Les compétitions équestres: Pour une éthique conséquentialiste des moyens" [Equestrian competitions: For a consequentialist ethic of means] (PDF). Revue Semestrielle de Droit Animalier (in French). Archived from the original (PDF) on 11 June 2017.
- Denis, Bernard (2015). Éthique des relations homme/animal [Ethics of human/animal relations] (in French). Éditions France Agricole. pp. 94–100. ISBN 978-2-85557-409-7.
- Digard, Jean-Pierre (1999). Les Français et leurs animaux! [The French and their pets!] (in French). Paris: Librairie Arthème Fayard. ISBN 2-213-60307-3.
- Gouguet, Jean-Jacques (2012). "Dopage des chevaux: Les enjeux économiques de la performance sportive" [Horse doping: The economic stakes of sports performance] (PDF). Revue Semestrielle de Droit Animalier (in French). Archived from the original (PDF) on 11 June 2017.
- Jeangène Vilmer, Jean-Baptiste (2008). Éthique animale [Animal ethics] (in French). Presses Universitaires de France. ISBN 978-2-13-063995-4.
- Jeangène Vilmer, Jean-Baptiste (2015). L'éthique animale [Animal ethics] (in French) (2nd ed.). Presses Universitaires de France. ISBN 978-2-13-073106-1.
- McIlwraith, C. Wayne; Rollin, Bernard E. (2011). Equine Welfare. John Wiley & Sons. ISBN 978-1-4443-9781-9.
- Onfray, Michel (2015). Haute école (in French). Paris: Groupe Flammarion. ISBN 978-2-08-137036-4.
- Poncet, Pierre-André; Bachmann, Iris; Burger, Dominik; Ceppi, Anne (2011). Réflexions éthiques face au cheval: Approche éthique des décisions à prendre pour bien faire ou éviter de faire mal [Ethical considerations when dealing with horses: An ethical approach to the decisions that need to be made in order to do the right thing or avoid doing harm.] (in French). Avenches: Rapport de l’Observatoire de la filière suisse du cheval. doi:10.13140/RG.2.1.3298.4489.
- "Réflexions sur l'éthique et le cheval" [Reflections on ethics and the horse] (in French). Haras National Suisse. Archived from the original on 4 March 2016.
