= Horse welfare reforms =

Changes in laws and practices for horse wellbeing

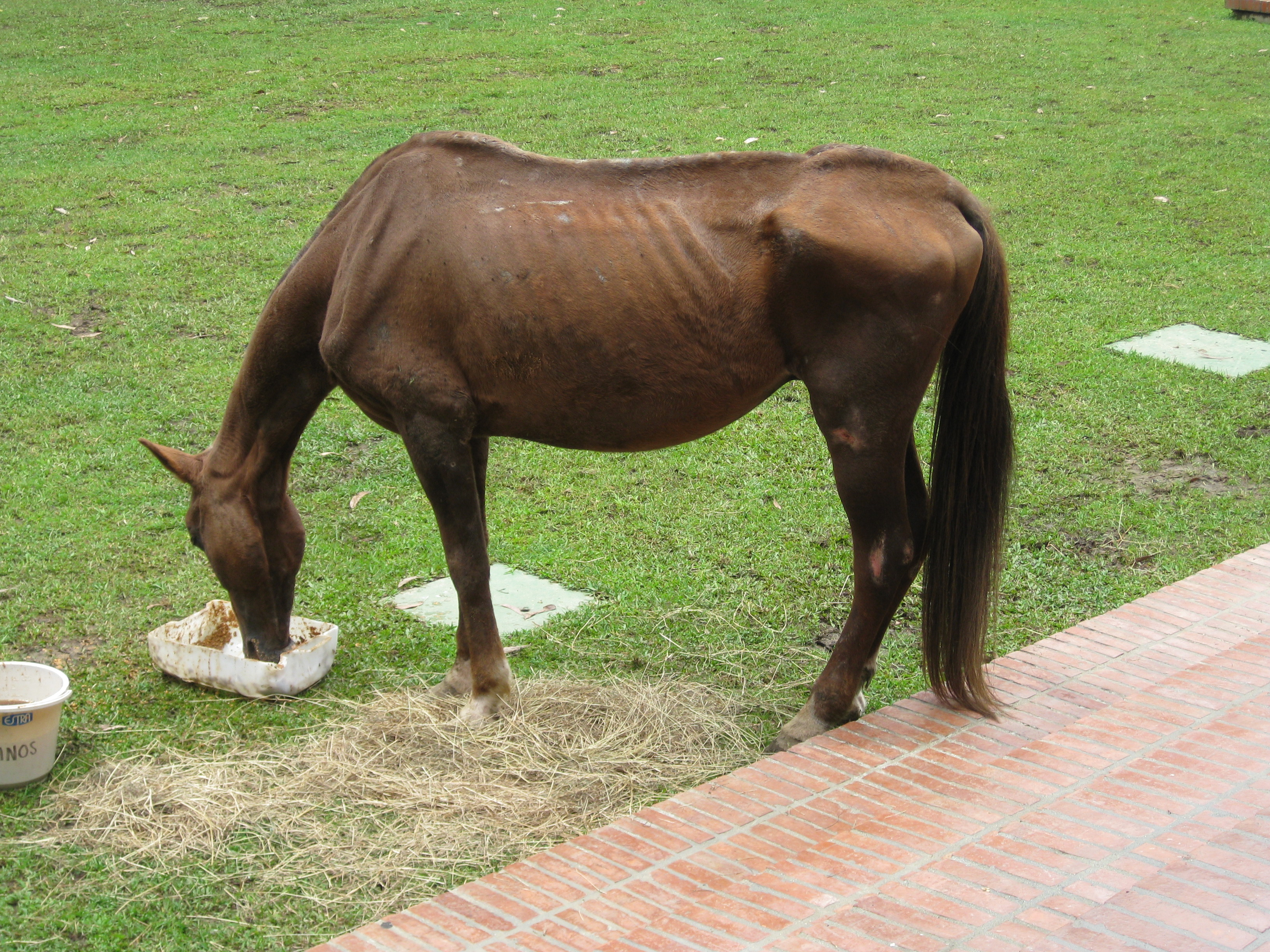
Horse rescued by a protection group while he was starving.

Horse welfare reforms refer to changes in laws, regulations, industry practices, and cultural norms aimed at improving the treatment and well-being of horses in various contexts, including sport, work, and companionship.

Many reforms have emerged in response to growing public concern over equine welfare, scientific research on animal behavior, and pressure from advocacy groups and professional organizations. Examples include the prohibition of tail docking in certain jurisdictions, the regulation of training techniques such as rollkur in competitive dressage, and the implementation of welfare standards by equestrian federations. While not always coordinated under a single movement, these reforms reflect a broader trend toward enhancing the ethical treatment of horses across disciplines and regions.

== Overview ==
Debates about the welfare and abuse of horses are recent. In the nineteenth century, when the sight of a horse dying while working was commonplace, the first wave of awareness was born with the Society for the Prevention of Cruelty to Animals and the publication of the novel Black Beauty in England. France followed suit with the creation of the French League for the Protection of the Horse and the passage of the Grammont Law in 1850. Similar concerns over animal welfare developed in the United States. The debate intensified and extended throughout North America and Europe over the next century, particularly regarding the use of the horse during war, the use of horses as working animals on city streets, sports training, horse slaughter, and conditions of horse breeding and keeping. In the United States, the practice of soring resulted in the passage of the Horse Protection Act of 1970 and various organizations protested against abuses in horse racing and rodeo. In the early twenty-first century, these issues remained in the public eye and new controversies arose, especially about training methods such as Rollkur, problems in the field of endurance riding, stable confinement, and the presence of carriage horses in modern cities such as New York City.

The definition of "well-being" is complex as regards the horse. Horses are very quiet and show few signs of discomfort, which makes the detection of pain particularly difficult. Theorists in the Western world once went so far as to consider the horse as incapable of feeling pain. The horse is also a sociable creature, designed by evolution to spend most of it time grazing in a natural setting. Horses develop stereotypic behaviors and other problems when kept in isolation, unable to graze, or if subjected to prolonged confinement in a stable.

The International Federation for Equestrian Sports (FEI) now prohibits certain specific training methods, including poling and Rollkur, as have several countries, notably Switzerland. Many nations have passed assorted laws to protect horses from practices that include tail docking, transportation for excessive lengths of time, and artificial aids in horse racing or other equestrian competitions are subject to bans or national or European limitations. Transportation to slaughterhouses is regulated. In the context of increased research on equine welfare, new practices such as natural horsemanship, barefoot hoof care, and even refusal of riding have developed. These suggest a major concern for the welfare of the horse will continue into the future.

== History ==
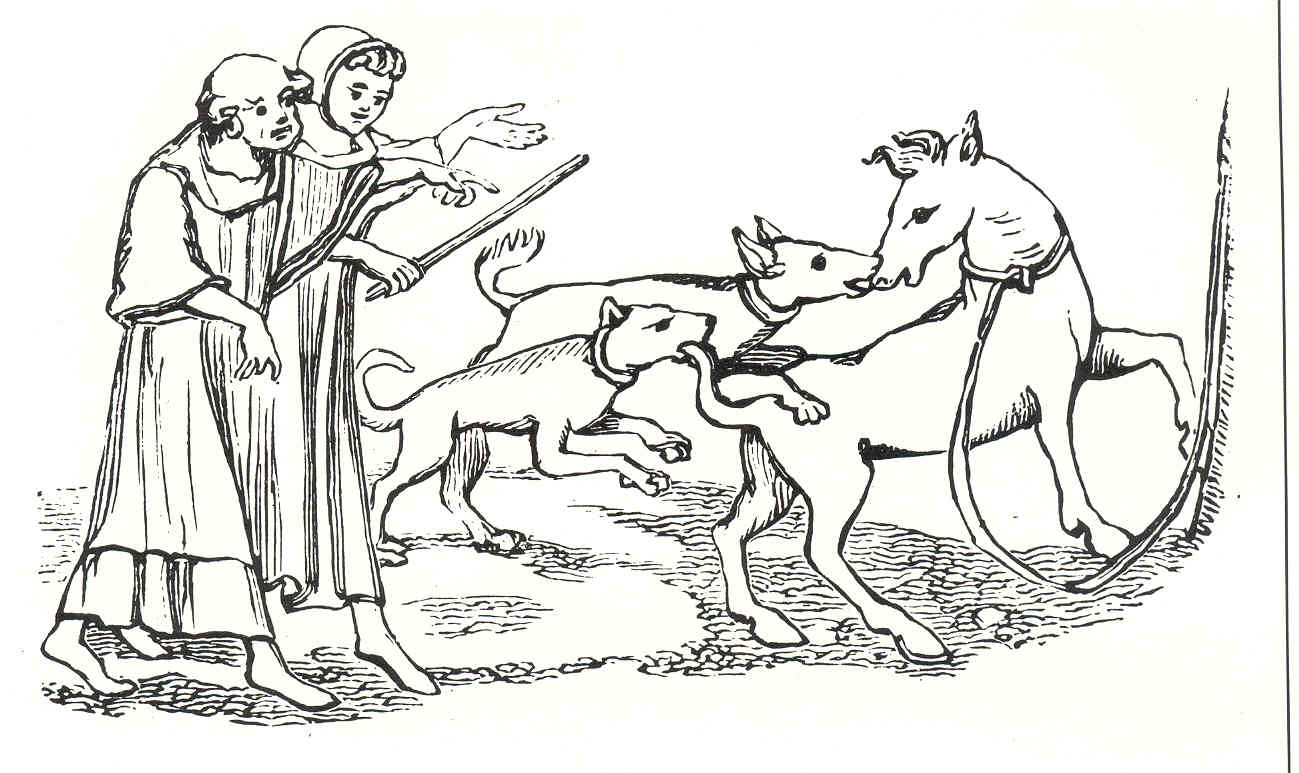
Horse-baiting scene, by Joseph Strutt. The horse is under several dog's attacks

The domestication of the horse enabled mankind to use this animal for a variety of tasks: labour, transportation, war. Once the horse loses its usefulness, it could even be slaughtered and turned into food for humans. Even, from the anti-species point of view, developing the species in slavery to be a worker. Pierre Enoff suggests that globally, this situation is more akin to a bondage that imposes prison-like conditions on the horse, as opposed to a symbiotic relationship between human and animal. The Italian ethnologist Sergio Dalla Bernardina explains the horse's situation by the desire of part of the human population to be "master" and to tyrannize living beings. "Those who like total submission prefer dogs or horses. Those who prefer light submission pick cats". The injuring, mutilating and putting to death of horses (witness the sacrifices, horse slaughtering, horse baiting, and the organization of stallion fights) are extensively documented in numerous regions of the world. Horses were routinely killed on the field of battle, branded, cut on the ears in order to facilitate quick recognition, spurred, or docked (have their tails amputated) from the 17th century to prevent the tail from becoming stuck in the harness. However, along with this treatment develop beneficial horse-human interaction for the animal, with many examples of worship. The detention of a horse implies the need to support themselves. From the perspective of the scientist David W. Ramey, the human-horse relationship has been beneficial to both species.

The consideration of equine welfare as a concept is recent in history. The Western religious and philosophical conception of animals has long denied that they have any sensation of pain, following the theory of the animal machine described by René Descartes in the 17th century. However, Islamic civilization of the period held a strong respect for the horse, according them (among other things) the possibility of spending the night in their masters' tents. At the beginning of the 21st century, the horse is largely recognized by biologists (and by the scientific world generally) as being a "sensible being". The horse is now idealized by many cultures. This evolution accompanies that of all of Western society, beginning from the mid-20th century with the animal welfare movement, having a greater recognition for their individuality. A common error is the belief that advances in respect for equine welfare arise from ethical and scientific considerations. In reality, these advances are derived almost exclusively from demands of activists and the general public.

=== 19th century ===
==== England ====
The first awareness of the cause of horses arise in England at the end of the 18th century. A law prohibiting the abuse of horses was proposed in the 1820s, but was not adopted. The Society for the Prevention of Cruelty to Animals was created in 1824 in London, in response to animal suffering. Its logo represents an angel come to punish a man beating his horse.

The novel Black Beauty, published in 1877 in Victorian England, is known as the first work that addresses equine welfare. Its originality is in giving voice to several horses who recount their daily suffering, in the form of an autobiography. It raises a strong awareness for the cause of the horses. The author, Anna Sewell, shows herself to be ahead of her time in terms of animal protection: her novel takes a stand against checkreins, blinkers, and tail docking. According to Amélie Tsaag Valren, the novel "prefigures in a certain way the disappearance of the horse in the city. Anna Sewell shows that this animal of flesh and blood, who feels pain and sadness, does not have a place in the urban environment and the industrial society of London". The novel provoked controversy in England upon publication. It was only over time that it became a best seller. Anna Sewell, who died five months after publication, affirmed that her goal was to improve the lot of horses in this country. The result exceeded her expectations, as the publication of the novel in the US in the context of equine suffering allowed the debate to foment in that country. The multiple translations of the novel even provoked debate elsewhere in Europe.

==== United States ====
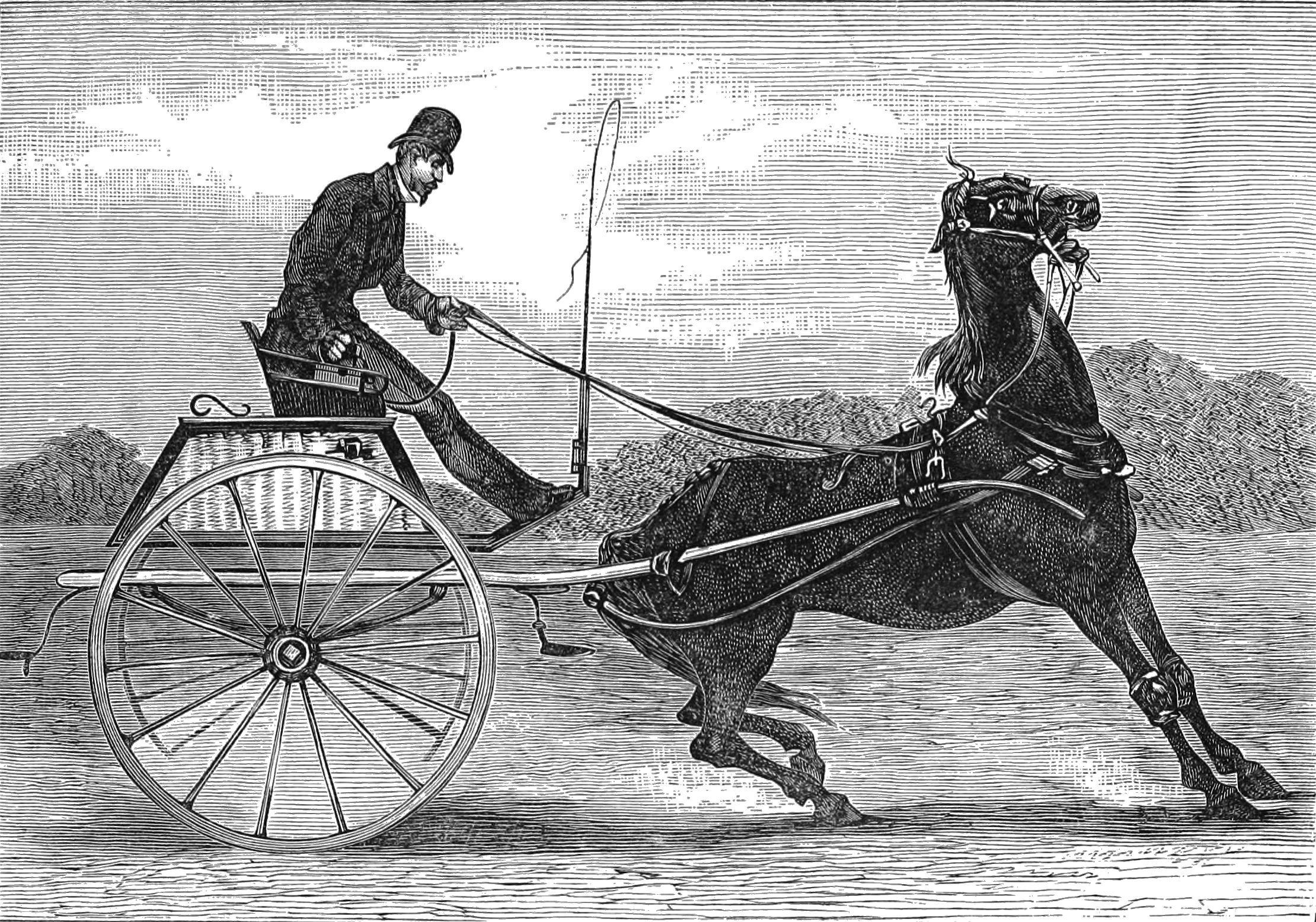
American print published in 1880, advising control of carriage horses by the application of electrical shock.

American documents relate several cases of horse exploitation leading to abuse, notably in bus and tram companies. These horse-drawn vehicles were often overloaded, and the horses pulling them were beaten and subject to hard labour.

The first definitions of horse maltreatment centred on the withholding of food and care, and the act of hitting them. The courts of New York were pioneers in this area, publishing a law that punished those who kill or deliberately torture animals (like horses) in 1829. The Court of the State of New Jersey tried a case of a man who beat his horse to death in 1858, but concluded that it was not illegal to beat one's own horse, despite the problem of the public spectacle it created. In 1860, Pennsylvania fined those who beat horses $200, double that charged to mothers who beat their children under 7 years old. Horse theft and mutilation of the animals of others was severely punished, reflecting financial and societal motives. Beating one's horse without a good reason was considered to be wrong and contrary to good morals, but the suffering felt by the animal was not taken into account. The punishment of those who mistreated their own horses was not immediately on the agenda, as the law could only be applied if proof was provided that the horse was beaten with bad intentions. The concept of animal torture was introduced in American law at the end of the 19th century, with the case of a man who applied acid to the hooves of his horses. The trend was also evidenced by lawsuits involving omnibus owners accused of exploiting their horses.

==== France ====
At the beginning of the 19th century, mistreatment was common, particularly for draft horses in the era of the July Monarchy. The phrase "swear like a trooper" was coined to refer to frustrated carters, quick to use the whip and scream at their horses. When the horse falls while in harness, the carter often tried to make it stand up with a kick to the stomach. Horses often died of exhaustion at work, in the middle of the street. Multiple sources, including a Victor Hugo poem written in 1838, demonstrated the pervasiveness of the public abuse of workhorses. The rise of capitalism led to crueler treatment, particularly where horses that are unable to work are sent to the knacker. Considered useless, these horses were sometimes made to wait for days before being shot, and as a result died from hunger or thirst. This contrast between the condition of workhorses and the horses of the bourgeoisie and the wealthy caused discomfort in French society. In 1845, the Société Protectrice des Animaux was created to protect horses from abuse. Jacques Philippe Delmas de Grammont, a former cavalry officer, created a league for the protection of the horse in 1850 and helped to pass the law that bears his name that year, prohibiting the deliberate abuse of animals. However, a debate arose in France at the end of the century regarding bullfighting (notably horse hernias), which were counter to the Grammont Law.

==== Other countries ====
In 1885 Leo Tolstoy published his story "Strider", narrated by a piebald horse named Surveyor. He recounts his castration, his start under the harness, and his racecourse abilities, until his bloody death at the hands of the knacker.

=== 20th century ===
There were more changes in the perception of equine welfare in the second half of the 20th century than in any other period of recorded history. According to Jean-Pierre Digard, awareness of the treatment of horses passed from respect to veritable love, bringing with it a new problem. While maltreatment was previously done by those who physically exploited horses, the 20th century saw the birth of mistreatment by ignorance of the needs of the animal, as anyone could become a horse owner for leisure purposes. Jean-Pierre Digard also thought that the feminization of equestrianism contributed significantly to the development of this phenomenon.

==== Anti-docking movement ====
Opposition to docking arose in the United States at the beginning of the century, as cars replaced horses as the primary means of transportation. The first state laws were created to ban the practice, arguing that it is cruel and useless, as it prevents the horse from chasing insects away with its tail. The practice was progressively banned or strongly discouraged in several countries. France limited the possibility of use in 1996, at the instigation of Brigitte Bardot. Philippe Vasseur approved a "series of actions destined to enforce a code of good conduct with regards to animals".

==== Anti-slaughter movements ====
The slaughter of horses for human consumption became the target of growing criticism. While in the 1910s this practice was habitual for the French, it decreased in the second half of the century. A food taboo affected horse meat in the English-speaking world.

In England, the horse welfare movement saw the emergence of its first great activist, Ada Cole, at the beginning of the century. Moved by the lot of British workhorses, exploited for their whole lives before being exported to Belgium to be slaughtered for their meat, she created the International League for the Protection of Horses in 1927. She successfully advocated for a ban on the export of live British horses for meat ten years later. The group she founded, since renamed World Horse Welfare, continues campaigning for the protection of horses worldwide. In 1947, the British Horse Society was founded with the protection of the horse (welfare) among its missions. However, the great figure of equine defense in the middle of the century was American Velma Bronn Johnston, called "Wild Horse Annie". Born in 1912, in 1950 she began campaigning to end the displacement and slaughter of mustangs and wild donkeys under pressure from settlers. According to her, her commitment arose from the day she discovered, on the road, a truck dripping with the blood of mustangs en route to the slaughterhouse. In 1959, her activist pushed the American government to issue a law that prohibited the slaughter of mustangs on state-owned land. Considering this victory to be insufficient, Velma Bronn Johnston managed to bring about the passage of the Wild Free-Roaming Horses and Burros Act in 1971 by Richard Nixon, which bans any mistreatment of mustangs.

Conversely, Australia passed no laws related to its local wild horses introduced at the end of the 18th century in response to the needs of settlers, nor its donkeys. From the 1980s until 2013, the slaughter of these animals from helicopters caused outrage for many animal defenders. The meat of Brumbies was used to make dog food. Long bled alive, horses slaughtered for their meat in the West are now stunned with a captive bolt pistol, to prevent them from suffering, despite captive bolts not being adequate to properly stun a horse. However, in 1983 Brigitte Bardot revealed to the public the conditions of transport of horses to Polish slaughterhouses, causing a stir. Since the 1990s equestrian centres, which accommodate the majority of riders, hid the sending of horses to slaughterhouses for fear of losing their clientele. The first rescue centres for abused horses or those under threat of being resold to slaughterhouses were created in the same era. The slaughter of horses for meat decreased 60% between 1980 and 2001 in France.

===== Bullfighting =====
In Spain, the frequent evisceration of horses in bullfighting arenas pushed Miguel Primo de Rivera to mandate the use of a protective cape, called the peto, in 1928. Thereafter, opposition to bullfighting sharply decreased. In 1932, Ernest Hemingway wrote Death in the Afternoon, which describes the indefensible side of the murder of these horses from the perspective of his contemporaries, although he himself found them funny.

==== Horse Protection Act of 1970 ====
In the United States, the Animal Humane Association was created in the 1940s to oppose the many horse deaths during filming of westerns. An opinion movement (mostly upheld by activists) denounced the cruelty of multiple practices on horses: use of severe bits, excessive use of the riding crop, training with electric shock, cuts of the tongue with reining, and more generally the macho attitude of much of the horse industry, wherein it was considered normal to hit horses to establish a dominance relationship and show them "who is the master". This movement led to the passing of the Horse Protection Act of 1970, which banned soring (compression of the hooves with wedges) and gingering (applying irritating substances to the anus or vagina to give the horse a more lively attitude). Between the 1950s and the 2010s, a dozen horse-protection societies were created in the US.

==== Other controversies ====
Near the end of the century, new polemics appeared against practices like poling (striking the legs of a horse as it goes over a jump to make it raise them higher on the next), branding (banned in several European Union countries), harness racing, and endurance racing. Several American groups tried to ban cross-country equestrianism at the 1996 Atlanta Olympics, arguing that the fixed obstacles were dangerous for horses. The development of natural horsemanship cannot be dissociated from this growing sensitivity to the horse at the end of the 20th century. The first practitioners emerged from the makers of American westerns. They developed this approach in reaction to the traditional practice of cowboys to "break horses", in order to propose an alternative to this style of riding. The pioneers were Tom Dorrance and Ray Hunt. Since the 1980s, this trend has imposed itself gradually on the equestrian landscape and is now accepted as standard. The successful film by Robert Redford, The Horse Whisperer (1998), popularized the principles of natural horsemanship among a wide audience.

=== 21st century ===
In the 21st century, the concern for the protection of the horse is still present in Western society, and is becoming increasingly internationalized. Some professional riders have been singled out and condemned for abuse. At the 2008 Olympics, four jumping horses tested positive for capsaicin, a chemical product applied to the skin to make it more sensitive to contact. American show-jumper Michal Morrissey was fined 5000 euros and suspended for three months for having struck his horse thirteen times with a riding crop as punishment during a competition in Florida in 2010. Austrian dressage rider Ulrike Prunthalier was sentenced to pay a 4000-euro fine in 2012 for having trained his horses with pebbles under the noseband and electric shocks.

In 2014, INRA considered existing laws for the protection of the horse in France as being concerned about the welfare of animals. The same year, a video of a horse being beaten in Saudi Arabia elicited a strong reaction in the country. Looking forward, there will likely be increased concern for the welfare of horses through the 21st century, which could lead to a progressive ban on horse racing, the stricter regulation of riding schools, and the development of a sense of companionship with the horse, at least in France and other Western countries.

==== Premarin ====
The production of conjugated estrogens sold under the name Premarin (with pregnant mare urine as the primary ingredient) is widely criticized (including by PETA and the Animal Liberation Front) as abusive. About 100,000 pregnant mares are kept locked in stalls in Canada and in China; the foals are killed shortly after birth so that the mare can again be impregnated.

These mares are kept in a permanent state of thirst so produce a more concentrated during, and live with a probe that causes itchiness. According to some accounts, they are frequent beaten and sometimes miscarry due to their living conditions. Despite multiple petitions to the lab, the production of Premarin will likely continue under the same conditions as the market is growing.

==== Rollkur ====
Controversy around rollkur first arose in 2005 with the release of a German news article denouncing the Dutch methods of training for dressage, notably that of forcing the horse's nose to the chest using reins. The article provoked a violent debate in the world of equestrian sports, extending to death threats against riders thought to train their horses with rollkur, and competition organizers who allowed them to do so. In 2010, the International Equestrian Federation created a distinction between rollkur and relaxation in a "low and round" position without the use of force. Despite the official ban, there were no reprimands or sanctions issued to trainers or riders known to practice rollkur.

==== Closure of American slaughterhouses ====
A violent debate arose in the US around the closure of horse slaughterhouses. First proposed and promoted in 2005, closures have been gradually conducted since 2013. The original idea was to protect horses from cruel deaths, but in fact the closure of slaughterhouses on American soil has translated into wide-scale transportation of "unwanted horses" to the US border, where they are transferred to neighbouring countries. According to some US sources, the number of abandonments and acts of cruelty to horses has increased. The Los Angeles Times reported a greater number of interventions in cases of horse abuse in California, where the slaughter was banned earlier than in other states; however, this information is contradicted by the University of California at Davis, which claims to have no record of increased maltreatment. Unwanted horses from US territory are sent to Mexico, Canada, and Brazil to be slaughtered, travelling over long distances and in hellish conditions to reach the slaughterhouses, creating a high level of stress. In 2013 the reopening of American slaughterhouses was advocated for reasons of protection.

Angered by the threats of horse protection association, a slaughterhouse worker in New Mexico released a video in which he shot and killed his own horse. As the killing of one's own horse is legal in the US, he was not convicted. This animal, named "Justice", is now celebrated as a martyr of horse slaughter. This act has aggravated the controversy around slaughter in the US.

==== Horse-drawn carriages ====
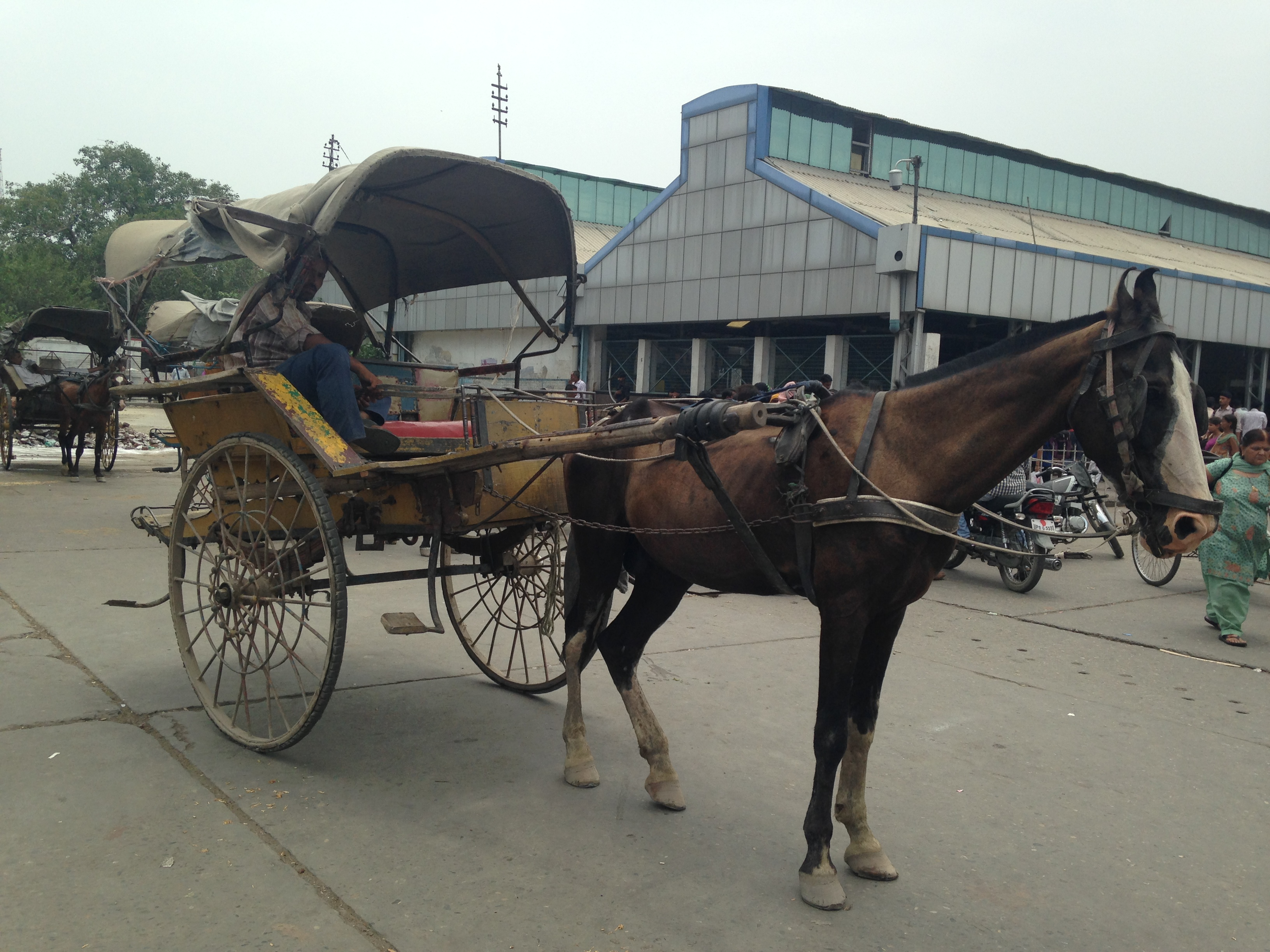
Horse-drawn carriage at Saharanpur, India.

Numerous arguments broke out in 2013 and 2014 concerning the use of horse-drawn carriages in urban settings or on roads. In New York City, the mayor proposed a ban of horse-drawn carriages, symbols of the city for a century, in Central Park for protection reasons. However, an inquiry showed possible collusion with the real estate sector. Israel became the first country to completely ban horse-drawn carriage traffic on the roads and the streets of its cities in 2014, to fight mistreatment of horses and donkeys. The only exception is for tourist attractions. This action was accompanied by a peace march that brought together 4000 supporters of animal rights.

The death of carriage horses devoted to tourist visits in the streets of Cartagena, Colombia, has been denounced as mistreatment, as has the stabling conditions of carriage horses in Mumbai, India.

== Signs and sources of maltreatment ==
To facilitate a definition of the notion of equine welfare, INRA suggests referring to the Five Freedoms defined by the Farm Animal Welfare Council in 1979:

- freedom from hunger, thirst, and malnutrition
- freedom from discomfort
- freedom from physical pain, illness, and injury
- freedom to express the normal behaviours of the species
- freedom from fear and anxiety

The first three are easy to recognize and enforce, but this is rarely the case for the last two. Unlike other domesticated species like dogs, the horse displays few external signs of discomfort and notably, it does not scream. Rapid tail lashes reflect the horse's discomfort, but can also be a means of repelling insects. Lameness is easy to detect, as the refusal to lift a limb or to let it be touched can indicate pain. In general, a horse that sweats profusely, is agitated, lies down or rolls on the ground, or trembles is certainly experiencing suffering. Looking towards the stomach is a sign of colic. Holding the head with the ears laid back provides valuable insight. Psychological distress is manifested by disinterest in the environment and other symptoms quite similar to depression. A sudden decrease in performance or stiffness at work might indicate a hidden physical problem.

Though a too-thin horse is clearly suffering, a state of obesity, more difficult to identify, causes as many physical problems, including a high risk of laminitis. Conversely, the thin horse is not necessarily being mistreated, as aging involves increased susceptibility to disease and difficulty gaining weight. The condition of the hooves is also an indicator. A horse whose hooves are very long (including slipper foot) or split is neglected and suffering.

Emotional factors are suspected to cause malaise. If horses do not show any signs of discomfort while being looked in the eyes, one study suggests that they perceive the emotional state of the onlooker and are influenced by it. Their heart rate increases in the presence of a person who claims a fear or dislike of horses, while it remains normal in the presence of those who love or are neutral towards the animal.

== Disputed practices ==
Many questions arise about the living conditions that man imposes on the domestic horse. They are frequently distanced from the life of the species in the wild. The horse is a naturally sociable animal, which does not react well to isolation. It can even become depressed and stop eating if its need for contact is not met. However, the horse can also experience unintentional suffering, in many cases resulting from ignorance or neglect. Man also tends to believe that the horse should be permanently available. A deficit in the living conditions offered to horses often creates problems in the human-horse relationship.

=== Physical interventions ===
The horse can undergo various physical interventions, including castration, docking (tail cutting), branding, or the cutting of the whiskers. Attacks on the physical integrity of the horse pose an ethical question in terms of equine welfare. As with other species, horse whiskers are tactile organs (located around the nose and mouth) that help them to perceive the environment outside its field of vision. Banned in Switzerland and Germany, the shaving of whiskers creates significant discomfort by reducing the animal's perception, which can lead them to bump into things.

==== Castration ====
Castration is primarily practiced for the convenience of humans, as it usually makes the male horse gentler and easier to handle and reduces the risk of fighting between males, while also allowing for control of the gene pool on farms. According to Päivi Nussbaumer, veterinarian at the Institut suisse de médecine équine (ISME), "surgical castration is demanding, painful, and can lead to severe complications".

==== Shoeing, soring and other foot interventions ====
The case of shoeing is special. It was originally a means of protecting the equine foot from wear and tear on different hard surfaces. However, its usefulness is questioned by a growing number of riders who feel that being "barefoot" is more consistent with the nature of the horse. According to Pierre Enoff, the horse does not really need shoeing, which frustrates locomotion and sensory perception by forcing it to rely solely on the hoof walls, unable to use the soles or assess the terrain. The dominant perspective of professionals in the horse world, including farriers, is to see shoeing as protection for the hoof. Similarly, moving to a barefoot approach too quickly can be harmful to horses that have lived with shoes for a long time if their feet are not prepared.

Conversely, the practice of soring in Tennessee Walking Horse and other racking horse competitive circles is roundly denounced as abuse by many veterinarians and horse specialists. Prohibited by the Horse Protection Act of 1970, the practice consists of using corrosive chemicals on the legs and fetlocks of gaited horses, causing them to exaggerate their movements.

==== Branding ====
Branding is less common than in the past. In France and Germany, its main purpose is the marketing and promotion of animals. Using branding for identification or proof of ownership of lost or stolen animals became obsolete with the popularization of the electronic chip. According to a study done at the University of Göttingen (2013), buyers are willing to pay 12% more for branded horses. Branding causes severe pain and may be seen as a cruel act, "suffering in the name of tradition and marketing". The red iron exposes skin to 700-degree heat. The branded horse has a 4 °C increase in body temperature on the day of branding, and an increase of 2 to 4 °C on the following six days. The body part that was branded has lesions typical of a third-degree burn with necrotic flesh.

==== Tail interventions ====
There are many interventions on the tail of the horse, mainly for aesthetic reasons (the practical reasons having disappeared with large-scale use of horse-drawn carriages). According to Sandra Tozzini, these practices are ethically reprehensible, even "criminal", and cause suffering "without cause". Cutting the tailing or raising it artificially often causes the horse to have increased action in its paces.

Docking is the most common intervention concerning the tail. Removal of the last vertebrae of the coccyx by cutting creates a shorter tail or a round stump. Docking is done almost exclusively on draft horses and hitches. Unique to the Anglo-Saxon world, nickering is the sectioning of the tail muscles, which has the effect of raising the tail. The animal must wear a "tail set" device after the operation to complete the process of muscle atrophy. This device is unpleasant and prevents the horse from going outside. Tail blocking is done by injection of alcohol into the nerve that controls the movement of this appendage, preventing the horse from moving its tail. This practice is less invasive than previous ones and is used illegally for contests where the movement of the tail, an indicator of the horse's discomfort, is disqualifying. Tail blocking can cause complications such as ataxia. The introduction of alcohol, spices or other irritants into the anus or vagina, called gingering, is used to force the horse to hold its tail higher and to give a more dashing impression.

=== Breeding ===
The breeding conditions of domestic horses differ significantly from the wild, whether in reproduction, the education of the foal, or the use of questionable practices and techniques. Hand breeding is a reproduction method that involves holding a mare before presenting her to the stallion. This method have been proven to be safe both for the mare and the stallion. Many stallions have died from being kicked by a mare. Many mares have been injured by a stalion trying to mount when the mare was not ready (vaginal tear, infections), or by the stallion biting during the mount.

Weaning the foal usually occurs much later in the wild than on the farm, where it is usually separated from its mother at the age of six month. The six-month-old foal moved from mother's milk to a forage diet, and usually move to a herd, where he can keep learning how to be a horse from his companions. This can be done over many days or week to let both get used to the absence of the other, or as a quick separation. Results vary depending on the environment, pasture mates and personality of the horses.

Hobbles are used during ranch work or trail riding, to provide semi-freedom of movement and prevent horses from going too far from base camp. Instead of tying a horse where it cannot move at all, grazing hobbles allow the horses to move around and graze. It also prevent over-grazing in an area.

=== Stabling ===
Conditions for keeping horses have barely changed in developing countries. In the wild, these animals move 10 to 15 kilometres daily and spend most of their lives grazing on fresh grass.

Horses are sometimes locked in stables, in a box or a stall, when not in use by humans. The size of the box is reduced (3 to 4 metres per side and 2.5 metres high), while the stall is even smaller. The horse has very little room to move. This confining stable, often reinforced with grills, also deprives it of contact with its peers. Food can sometimes be often thrown on the floor, where the horse is forced to urinate and defecate. According to the definition of equine welfare advocated by INRA and the Farm Animal Welfare Council, because life in a box or stall prevents the horse from expressing its normal behaviour, it constitutes a form of abuse. Other specialists like Pierre Enoff (who compares the boxed horse to a goldfish in a glass of water) and Laetitia Bataille (who compares the term "equine detention" to prison vocabulary) also believe that the box format causes suffering. The damages caused by this prolonged life in a box or stall are at the root of stable vices. These behavioural problems of domestic horses often come from isolation and lack of exercise. Their expression can be varied. The Institut français du cheval et de l'équitation advises never leaving a horse alone, either in the paddock or in the stable. In the case where a horse is placed in a box or stall, Swiss law requires that the horse is allowed out for at least two hours each day. After all, these living conditions create aggression: the further removed from conditions in the wild, the more relationship problems among horses increase.

==== Turnout ====
Life in the paddock on the surface appears to allow the horse to move and graze freely; however, it is not an absolute guarantee of well-being. The horse remains dependent on humans for care. The case of a stray horse escaping from their paddock may result from external malice, but also from the poor consideration of needs (lack of food, water freezing in the trough in winter, proximity of something frightening) that drives it to escape. Straying is at the origin of many serious accidents, particularly collisions with vehicles. The design of the paddock also poses a risk to the horse because of hunting: cases of horses killed by stray bullets or deliberately slaughtered are regularly reported.

The use of barbed wire is also a source of accidents. In some climates, horses require a shelter for protection from the elements and the wind. To better meet the horse's needs while facilitating its maintenance, the Germans created the concept of "active stabling", which is based on new technologies. The horses are housed in groups and automatically fed as they require, with unlimited access to rest and recreation areas.

==== Transportation ====
The transport of horses is by its nature contrary to the five freedoms because of the lack of available space and the lack of access to food and water. Studies also demonstrate a marked increase in horse stress during transport, particularly at the beginning. This stress decreases with experience, but remains present. Furthermore, the movement of the transport van forces the horse to regularly correct its position, which can cause it fatigue over time. The lack of water is a real problem, as horses sweat a lot during transport. Stops to allow the horse to drink are essential to its welfare, and access to hay is non-negotiable.

=== Working conditions ===
Other questions arise with the way in which mankind puts the horse to work. Well-conducted equestrianism is similar to sports training in that it allows the horse to gain flexibility and muscle. The wrong approach to riding, however, causes back pain because of the weight of the rider on the dorsal and thoracic vertebrae. Positioning the neck high and hollow (where the rider keeps his hands high and holds the reins tight) is particularly deleterious. These problems are exacerbated by the excess weight carried by some riders relative to the horse's constitution: according to studies, the rider's weight should not exceed 20 to 29% (including equipment) of the horse's weight. However, certain breeds are better carriers than others, particularly the mixed breeds. The exploitation of certain horses for mounted or harnessed equestrian tourism, in Camargue among other places, causes considerable suffering through lack of rest or care.

In Russia, Nevzorov High School brought forward a petition requesting a total ban of equestrian and horse sports, arguing that they are against the nature of the horse, causing great pain in its mouth (up to 300 kilograms of pressure per square centimetre) and damage to the neurological system. This petition follows a long investigation into the practices of professional riders, including photographs and autopsies of high-level horses with physical damage due to equestrianism. While the subject was taboo until 2015, a growing number of riders do not ride (or no longer ride) on horseback, believing that this is a source of discomfort for the animal. The sociologist Jérôme Michalon suggests that "this development is in line with that of society". However, Laetitia Bataille calls the idea that all forms of riding are abusive "extremist".

=== Equipment ===
Equestrianism involves the use of a wide variety of equipment: artificial aids such as the reins and whip, and tack (saddle and bridle with one, two bits, or none). Misuse of this equipment makes riding uncomfortable or even painful for the horse. Nosebands are often too tight, although the official recommendation is to insert two fingers between it and the head. The jaws, which can act upon the tongue or teeth of the horse according to the position of his head, creates pressure which becomes painful when the reins are too tight. If it becomes chronic, the pain degenerates into neuralgia that radiates through the head of the horse, from its ears to the tip of its nose. Among horses that are victims of a hard hand, the tongue can turn blue with the action of the bit and bridle, a "very painful" phenomenon that can cause "irreversible lingual lesions".

To avoid this problem, some riders work without bits, but this type of equipment poses other problems. The so-called "ethological" halters act through pressure points on the hard parts of the head, creating strong pressures over small areas.

The saddle must be well adjusted to the animal's body, but this is not always done. A study in Brazil showed that over 50% of saddles are not adapted to the horse wearing them, with 40% being too far forward on the back. The rider can also misuse the spurs and the whip.

=== Horse racing ===
In the world of horse racing, the growth of the young foal is stimulated by a specific diet. These foals are put to work at the age of eighteen months, and those who do not adapt to the racecourse are taken out of service. Those taken out, which are an important part of the slaughter of horses for meat, often develop health and comportment problems.

Harness racing According to the Australian scientist Paul McGreevy, the use of the riding crop in horse racing is "the most public and the most televised form of violence in the modern world". It raises a greater ethical problem because of the pain inflicted on an animal generally exhausted from effort. His study demonstrates that the (frequent) use of the crop does not translate into better racing performance, as race horse breeds are already genetically selected to run as fast as possible. In addition, blows delivered in the last 200 metres of the race often hit the horse in the sensitive part of the abdomen, leaving a very visible mark. The "anti-pain crop" invented in England is actually as painful as others.

The discreet use of electric shocks on racing horses seems to have become widespread since 1974, with hundreds of cases reported. This cruel technique, which aims to make the horses run faster, is evidently officially prohibited.

=== Other equestrian sport ===
Equestrian sports raise the issue of respect for the physical and mental limits of the horse. All equestrian sports require demanding training and can involve doping. Horses react poorly to the incessant repetition of the same exercise. Sports riders also tend to employ coercive mechanical means, including reins and severe bits, to push the horse to maintain the attitude they are looking for over the course of patient training. Some training methods are denounced or even banned for their cruelty. This is the case with rollkur (hyperflexion of the neck) in dressage, banned by the International Equestrian Foundation if obtained by force or maintained for more than ten minutes. Poling, which is to hit the legs of the horse while jumping over obstacles to make it lift them higher, is officially banned in competition and in training. It is still commonly used discreetly. The use of the crop in show-jumping competition does not result in better performance, according to a study conducted in 2013 in the UK. In this sport, other abuses intended to force the horse to "respect" the bars are regularly found: coating the legs with the sensitizing product, training with metal bars that cause great pain when hit, or tightening the rear gaiters in such a way as to act on a tendon.

Endurance competitions are often at the heart of scandals involving the death of mounts during or after the competition, as well as a large number of doping cases. These problems likely result from a cultural conflict between Western and Middle Eastern riders.

=== Film and television ===
The use of horses during the filming of television series or films frequently results in problems of animal abuse, as noted by a Hollywood Reporter investigation in 2013. These cases can also occur during the filming of prestigious films, such as Peter Jackson's The Hobbit, which saw the death of three horses in New Zealand. The Animal Humane Association recommends replacing horses as often as possible with digital imagery. However, in France, there are no official regulations concerning the safety of horses on film sets.

=== Horse-fighting ===
Historically, the use of horses as combat animals was very common, both in the context of war as well as rituals and entertainment such as horse-baiting. Organized stallion fighting persists in Southeast Asia (southern China and the Philippines). This results in numerous injuries. Some blows exchanged cause horses' eyes to be sprung from their sockets. Stallions can even pull the ears off of their rivals. Most animals end up covered in bites. However, "progress" was made in 2014, to the extent that injured Chinese fighting stallions are no longer systematically killed and consumed on the spot by being cooked on the barbeque, but are treated for their injuries.

=== Rodeo ===
The rodeo is accused of using various interventions to increase the aggressiveness of the horse before its entrance to the run. Electric shocks are commonly used, leading to the death of an animal in 2012. The growing controversy around events like the Calgary Stampede and the Houston Rodeo led to a total ban on rodeos in certain parts of the American continent. Bullfighting involves the participation of a rider, called a picador, whose mount is protected by a caparison, with one or both eyes covered. Rejon bullfighting is practiced only on horseback and without protective caparison. Accidents can always occur, during which horses are punctured by the bull. An editorial in Horse magazine denounced the code of silence that reigns on the subject of the number of horses killed in bullfights. The Anti-Bullfighting Alliance estimates this number to be 20 horses per year.

=== Slaughter ===
The consumption of horse meat is an ethical question beyond that of the suffering of the animal. This ethical issue is invoked by animal-protection associations like the SPA, which state that retired horses are slaughtered for meat after having served humans. "After being loved and carefully tended, whatever its merits, the brave horse will not experience a peaceful retreat: at its first failure, it becomes butcher's meat, and will be led to slaughter the very next day". Horses intended for consumption are rarely killed where they lived. The question of equine welfare arises during the transport to slaughter as well as the slaughter itself. These horses often transit through "cattle fairs" where abuses (lack of food and water, beatings) are not uncommon. Breeders are responsible for the sale to slaughterhouses, particularly in the overproduction of racehorses, whereby three-quarters do not pass racecourse selection tests, and in the absence of withdrawal solutions to provide a "second career" to these animals.

EC Regulation 1/2005 sets rules for slaughter throughout the European Union, including obligating the feeding and watering of animals during transport, and banning the transport of sick or injured animals or the use of double-decker trucks. Transport conditions are regularly denounced by animal-welfare groups, and despite the claims of industry professionals they rarely meet regulations. EC Regulation 853/2004 is meant to ensure the prior stunning of the horse to prevent it from suffering. Horsemeat professionals claim that their industry is committed to equine welfare during slaughter. However, slaughtering conditions are frequently denounced in associations in France and Belgium, the Netherlands, and especially the Americas. These associations found and filmed numerous abuses during investigations, such as animals regaining consciousness before being bled and thus suffering greatly.

Eric Baratay and Jean-Pierre Digard explain the rejection of horsemeat consumption in developed countries by a change in the status of the horse, as it is becoming close to a pet. In the United States, the horse has heroic and prestigious cultural baggage that disassociates it from consumable animals in the public's mind.

== Associations and protective measures ==
There are many animal protection associations, whether focused on the horse or not. Among the most active in France are the Brigitte Bardot Foundation (which campaigns against horsemeat consumption), the 30 Million Friends Association, the French League for the Protection of the Horse (the oldest), the Centre d'hébergement des équidés maltraités, and One Voice. At the international level, World Horse Welfare is under the patronage of Princess Anne.

Some countries and states are very invested in the protection of the horse. This is the case in Switzerland, where the latest version of the Ordinance on the Protection of Animals, in force since 1 January 2014, prohibits many interventions on the horse and requires that detention conditions respect its welfare, including regular movement and outings of at least 2 hours per day. California has made the slaughter of horses and their transport to slaughter illegal, and has also banned rodeos. Massachusetts residents advocated for the end of slaughter in 2004. The International Equestrian Federation forbids poling and rollkur if obtained "by force". The French riding federation limited the number of strikes of the crop permitted in jumping courses to three in 1990. Jumping courses and events are increasingly regulated on an international level. The number of daily attempts by the jumping horse is limited and all falls result in elimination. Conversely, many countries have no laws to protect horses or animals in general. This is notably the case in China.

Practice	Country or body banning or limiting (date)	Country or body permitting
Docking (other interventions on the tail generally benefit from a legal vacuum)	Germany; Austria (2004); Belgium (2001); Denmark (1991); United Kingdom (1949); Ireland (1965); Norway (1974); Switzerland); Docking is not specifically prohibited in France, but since 1996 it prevents the participation of the animals in competitions and equestrianism, as well as any activity funded by the state. In the absence of US federal law, 12 states prohibit the practice (California, South Carolina, Connecticut, DC, Illinois, Massachusetts, Michigan, Minnesota, New Hampshire, New York, Ohio, and Washington), as do 5 Australian states.	Canada
Branding	Total ban: Denmark, Netherlands, Belgium, Scotland; Limitation: France (branding requirement removed from the classic cycle in 2005, promotion of the electronic chip to replace branding)	Germany (local anesthetic mandatory beginning in 2019)
Neurectomy and desensitization of the skin in competition	International Equestrian Federation; Switzerland
Poling	International Equestrian Foundation (2008); United States (United States Equestrian Federation) allowed it only with a bamboo baton until 2008, total ban since); Switzerland (2014)
Rollkur / Hyperflexion	International Equestrian Federation (in all international competitions if maintained by force and/or for more than 10 minutes, February 2010); Switzerland (total ban, January 2014)
Riding crop	International Equestrian Federation: three strokes in jumping competitions; Fédération française d'équitation: three strokes in jumping competitions (1990) and a ban on targeting the head. Seven strokes are allowed in horse racing
Shaving of whiskers	Switzerland; Germany
Soring and other methods of damaging the front legs	United States (1970); Switzerland
Electric shock	Switzerland
Containment with barbed-wire fence	France (if the establishment is open to the public); Switzerland (2010)
Slaughter without stunning	France (1974); European Union (2004)	Horsemeat-consuming countries practicing Halal: Kazakhstan, Kyrgyzstan, Turkmenistan (in theory)
Slaughter	United States (2007–2013)	All others, including the United Kingdom and the United States since 2013

== Criticism ==
Ethnologist Jean-Pierre Digard is very critical of the horse welfare movement since the late 20th century. He believes that "the increasingly severe critiques made by some protectionist movements" (which he calls "animalitarians") and "complacently relayed and amplified by part of the equestrian press" could result in the banning of equestrian sports and riding, and eventually the total extinction of the horse for lack of use. This opinion, however, is not shared, as teaching a more ethical approach to riding constitutes a barrier to the threat of extinction of the horse for lack of use. In addition, the development of cloning will soon permit the resurrection of extinct species and breeds.

Anthropomorphism and ignorance of the horse, on the other hand, are real obstacles to a proper consideration of animal welfare, as many people wrongly believe themselves to be acting for the "good" of the horse. One example is the proliferation of the "horse rescues via the internet". Calls for donations permit the purchase of horses destined for slaughter, but the people acquiring them do not always have the knowledge or the financial means to ensure their welfare over the long term. These animals are thus condemned to a "slow death". Another example the "false good idea" to ban the slaughter of horses, which has led to even more of the suffering that it was meant to prevent. Similarly, the natural horsemanship approach (treeless saddles, bits without mouthpieces, bare feet...) sometimes leads to the inappropriate use of equipment, or its removal when it is necessary.

== See also ==
- Horse cloning
- Horse body mass
- Equine ethics

== Bibliography ==
- McIlwraith, C. Wayne; Rollin, Bernard E., eds. (2011). Equine Welfare. UFAW Animal Welfare. Vol. 8. John Wiley & Sons. p. 488. ISBN 978-1-4443-9781-9.
- Tozzini, Sandra (2003). "Hair today, gone tomorrow: equine cosmetic crimes and other tails of woe" (PDF). Animal Law Review: 159–181.
- Favre, David S.; Tsang, Vivien (Spring 1993). "The Development of Anti-Cruelty Laws During the 1800s". Detroit College of Law Review. 1993 (1).
- Cook, William Robert; Strasser, Hiltrud (2003). Kells, Sabine (ed.). Metal in the mouth: the abusive effects of bitted bridles. Sabine Kells. p. 138. ISBN 978-0-9685988-5-6.
