= Chola (disambiguation) =

The Chola Empire was a medieval empire in Southern India.

Chola may also refer to:

== Indian dynasties ==
- Early Cholas, an ancient kingdom on southern India
- Chola dynasty, a predominant dynasty in southern India
  - Telugu Cholas, a Telugu branch of the Chola Dynasty
- Cholas of Nellore, also as known Nellore Chodas or Nellore Chola, were one of the branch of Chola families who ruled from 11th to 14th centuries

== People ==
- Alex Chola (1956–1993), Zambian footballer
- Chola Chabuca (born 1970), Peruvian television personality
- La Chola Poblete (born 1989), Argentinian artist, activist

== Places ==
- Chola (historical city) (Russian: Чола), a former city and state in Russia
- Chola Mountains, in Sichuan, China
- Chola Nadu, a region of Tamil Nadu, India
- ITC Grand Chola Hotel, in Chennai, India
- Chola Sheraton, a hotel in Chennai, India

== Social groups ==
- Chola, a female of the cholo racial category
  - Pollera women, an Andean women's culture often called cholas
- Chola (Mexican subculture), a Latino subculture originating in Los Angeles

== Other ==
- Chola (film), a 2019 Indian Malayalam-language film
- Chola incident, a series of military clashes between India and China in 1967
- Puntius chola, a fish commonly known as the swamp barb
- Sikh chola, a robe-like unisex garment worn by Sikh warriors and religious workers

== See also ==
- Cho La (disambiguation)
- Cholla (disambiguation)
- Cholai, bootleg alcohol in India
- Cholai (film), a 2016 Indian film
- Cola (disambiguation)
- Chola invasion of Kalinga (disambiguation)
- Cholita
