= Eleanor Whitton =

Irish animal rights campaigner

- Born: Eleanor Constance Beatty; 1879; County Longford
- Died: 28 March 1956 (aged 76–77); Clonskeagh, Dublin

Eleanor Whitton (1879 – 28 March 1956) was an Irish animal welfare campaigner, being a founding member of the South County Dublin Society for the Prevention of Cruelty to Animals and the Irish branch of the International League for the Protection of Horses.

== Biography ==
Eleanor Whitton was born as Eleanor Constance Beatty in 1879 in County Longford. She was the daughter of Church of Ireland minister, Rev. Alexander Beatty. She married Henry M. Whitton, registrar of the court of appeal in 1902. The couple had a son and two daughters. In 1954 their son, Cuthbert Henry Whitton, was appointed prime judge in the supreme court of Singapore. As a skilled horse rider, Whitton was one of the founding members of the South County Dublin Society for the Prevention of Cruelty to Animals (SPCA) in 1905, serving as the honorary secretary until 1954. She led a campaign against the export of horses for slaughter in 1928 by being an establishing member of the International League for the Protection of Horses (ILPH), a charity originally set up by Ada Cole, being the honorary director of the charity in Ireland for the rest of her life. ILPH was described as "almost a one-woman show", Whitton conducted investigations into the shipping conditions of horses, and launched a campaign to ban their live export. She is believed to have bought between 4000 and 9000 horses personally to rescue them, aiding in the purchase of "rest fields" for them in Rathfarnham, the first type of sanctuary of its kind in Ireland.

At the end of World War II, Ireland began exporting large numbers of horses for France and Belgium for horse meat, with Whitton spending a large portion of time watching the loading of live animals. She would ensure that the conditions on the ships were good, and that the horses were fit to travel. On one occasion she hired a vet to travel on a ship bound for France. She travelled across Ireland inspecting horses in her capacities in both the SPCA and ILPH. The work of Whitton and these groups came to public attention in 1952 when SPCA, ILPH, Our Dumb Friends' League and the Dublin Animals' Protection Association organised a protest march through central Dublin of 1000 people on 28 March 1952. They also held a well-attended meeting on 28 April 1952 at the Mansion House, Dublin. The common policy of the three groups was called the "five Ps", namely parades, posters, protest meetings, publicity and politics. Whitton did not live to see the ban on live horse exports from Ireland, but the campaigns resulted in legislation being passed to that effect in 1961, 1963 and 1964. Her work also secured the support of a number of TDs including Patrick O'Donnell, Alfred Patrick Byrne, William Norton, Patrick Cogan, Henry Morgan Dockrell, Michael Ffrench-O'Carroll, William Davin and taoiseach John A. Costello.

Whitton's work has been viewed as bringing animal welfare into Irish public policy. She died at her home at 10 Laburnum Road, Clonskeagh, Dublin on 28 March 1956.
