= Cuthbert Whitton =

British colonial judge (1905–1995)

- Born: 18 February 1905; Ireland
- Died: 27 August 1995 (aged 90)
- Education: University College Dublin
- Occupations: Colonial administrator and judge
- Children: 1
- Mother: Eleanor Whitton

Cuthbert Henry Whitton (18 February 1905 – 27 August 1995) was a British colonial administrator and judge.

== Early life and education ==
Whitton was born on 18 February 1905 in Ireland, the son of Henry and Eleanor Whitton. His mother was a notable animal welfare campaigner. He was educated at St Andrew's College, Dublin and University College Dublin. He was called to the Bar at Gray's Inn in 1939.

== Career ==
Whitton joined the Malayan civil service as a cadet in 1929, and served in various posts including in succession, collector of land revenues and coroner in Penang; assistant district judge of the Straits Settlements; acting assistant district officer for Butterworth; and acting district judge and magistrate in Singapore. In 1932, he was appointed acting Resident in Labuan before he returned to Singapore where served in various judicial posts up to the Second World War.

In 1939, after being called to the Bar in England, Whitton transferred to the colonial legal service, and returned to Malaya where he was appointed deputy public prosecutor and crown counsel in Penang, and subsequently acting solicitor-general of the Malaya Union. As public prosecutor, he conducted prosecutions against collaborators employed by the Kempetai during the Japanese occupation of Malaya. In 1950, he became the Federal Supreme Court registrar, and principal assistant secretary in the Federal Secretariat.

In 1951, he was appointed a puisne judge of the Federal Supreme Court of the Federation of Malaya. In 1952, he served as a chairman of the board set up by the Federal government to investigate labour practices in the rubber industry and to make recommendations. In 1953, he was appointed a puisne judge of the Supreme Court of Singapore. In 1955, he served as chairman of the advisory committee which reviewed the cases of people detained in Singapore under the emergency regulations. He retired in 1957.

After leaving Singapore, Whitton served in the legal department of the UK Foreign Compensation Commission (FCC) involved in assessing compensation due to British claimants for losses suffered abroad, a post he held from 1959 to 1971.

== Personal life and death ==
Whitton married Iris Elva Moody in 1938 and they had a daughter.

Whitton died on 27 August 1995, aged 90.
