= Cho La =

Cho La may refer to:

- Cho La (Sikkim, India and Tibet, China), a mountain pass between Sikkim, India and Tibet, China
- Cho La (Nepal), a mountain pass in Nepal
- Cho La (Sichuan), a mountain pass in Sichuan, China
  - Chola Mountains, a mountain range in western Sichuan, China, named after the pass

== See also ==
- Chola (disambiguation)
