= Chola invasion of Kalinga =

Chola invasion of Kalinga may refer to these invasions, by the Imperial Cholas of southern India, of Kalinga in eastern India:

- Chola invasion of Kalinga (1097)
- Chola invasion of Kalinga (1110)

== See also ==
- Chola (disambiguation)
