= Cholla =

Cholla may refer to:

== Geography ==
- Jeolla Province (Chŏlla), a former Korean province
  - North Jeolla Province (North Jeolla), province in the southwest of South Korea
  - South Jeolla Province (South Jeolla), province in the southwest of South Korea
- Cholla Power Plant, Arizona

== Animals and plants ==
- Cholla (horse), a painting horse born in Nevada
- Cylindropuntia (cholla cacti), a genus of cylindrical-stemmed cacti

== Other uses ==
- Cholla or Challah, a type of bread of Jewish origin
- "Cholla" (song), by the Joy Formidable
