= Jules Rühl =

Belgian animal welfare activist

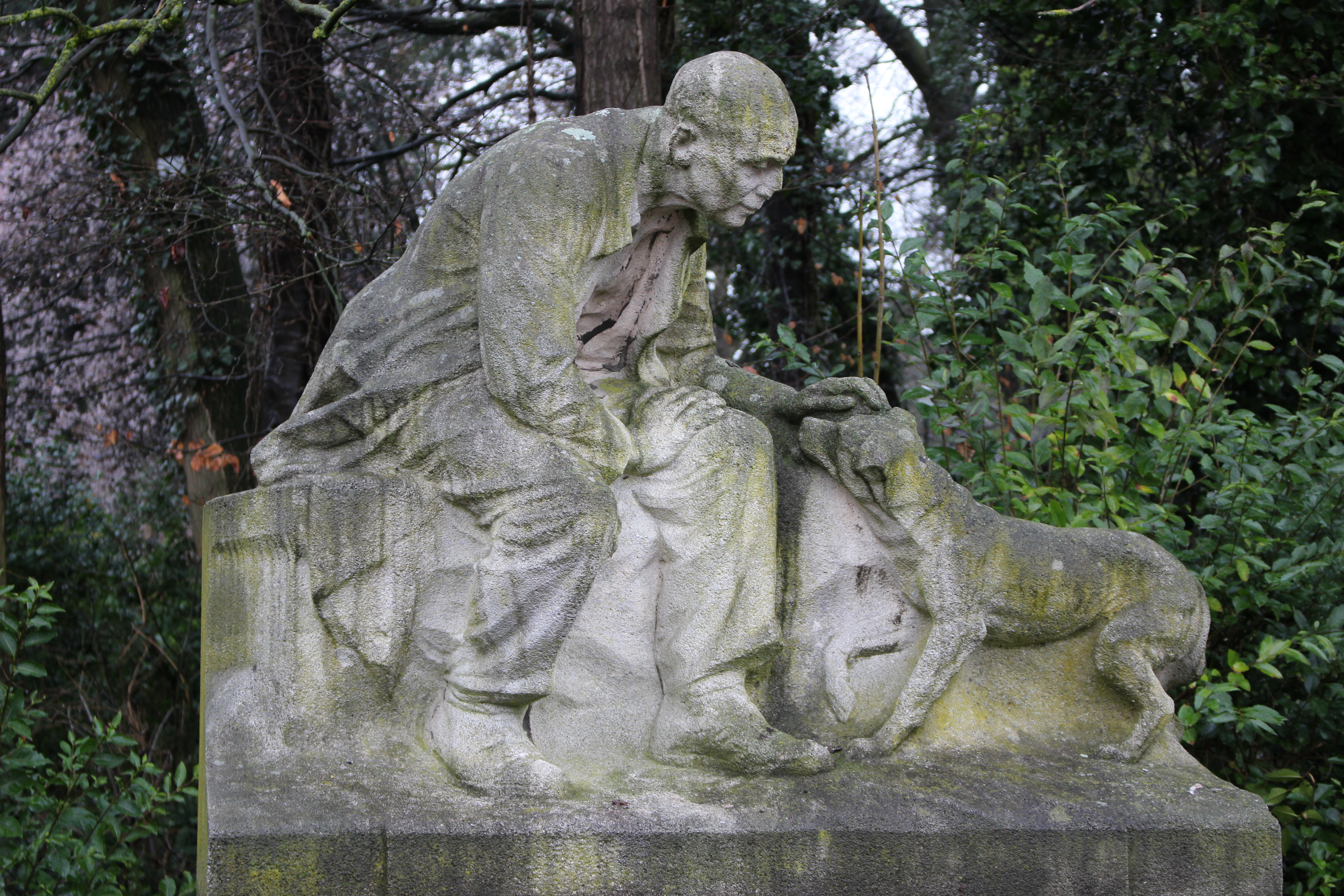
Statue of Jules Ruhl in Astrid Park, Brussels

Jules Rühl (1864 – 31 December 1936) was a Belgian animal welfare activist. During his life he was known as an apostle of animal protection.

== Career ==
Rühl who worked in Anderlecht founded the Brussels Society Against Cruelty to Animals in 1897. In 1908 he founded Veeweyde, the first shelter for lost and abandoned animals in Belgium. He was the editor of the magazine Nos Meilleurs Amis (Our Best Friends). He proposed Belgium's first animal protection law which was implemented in 1929.

Rühl was a vegetarian in his personal life but was supportive of humane slaughter. He campaigned for the use of anaesthetics and humane killers in slaughterhouses as well as improving working conditions. He invented a humane pistol for killing livestock. He was a vice-president of the International Humanitarian Bureau from 1936 to 1938, an organization connected to the Animal Defence and Anti-Vivisection Society.

== Death ==
Jules Rühl died in 1936 on a platform at the Gare du Midi, during an accident from transporting horses to Paris.

== Legacy ==
A statue was erected in Astridplein to honour Ruhl's animal welfare work. Jules RühlStreet in Anderlecht is named in his honour.

Pierre Theunis made a sculptor of Jules Rühlwith an inscription on the front: "Jules Rühl protector of the humble and the weak, defender of mistreated animals".
