= Ada Cole =

English horse welfare advocate (1860–1930)

- Born: Ada Merrett Frances Cole; 1 January 1860; Croxton Hall
- Died: 17 October 1930; London
- Occupation: Activist

Ada Merrett Frances Cole (1 January 1860 – 17 October 1930) was an English nurse, animal welfare activist and founder of the International League Against the Export of Horses for Butchery, later renamed the International League for the Protection of Horses, now known as World Horse Welfare. She was largely responsible for making the transport of horses for slaughter more humane and for improving horse abattoirs. She was decorated for her actions while nursing in Belgium in World War One.

== Early life ==
Ada Cole was born on Croxton Hall Farm near Thetford on the Norfolk/Suffolk border. She was a daughter of Louisa Henrietta (née Clarke) and Edward Cole, an eloped couple, and was one of ten children, of whom only five survived infancy. She was educated at home by her mother and a relative, Mrs. Merrett, who acted as governess. The family were tenant-farmers of some eleven hundred acres and used Shire horses and oxen to work the land. The children thus grew up surrounded by horses and cattle, and had dogs and a donkey. Louisa Cole died unexpectedly in 1883, aged fifty-two. It was discovered that Edward Cole had been living a double life with Emily Clarke, whom he married in 1888, having already had two children with her. Ada and her younger sister Effie left home for London soon after their mother's death.

== Before the First World War ==
From 1883, Cole worked as a nurse at the thirty-year-old London Fever Hospital near King's Cross. At that time, before the era of motorized transport, horses were the major means of transport and haulage. The suffering of cab horses had already prompted Anna Sewell's famous tale, Black Beauty, first published in 1877 by Jarrolds of Norwich. Sewell was also born in Norfolk. Cole was just as dismayed as that author at seeing overworked cab horses collapsing in the street from exhaustion and ill health. Having been raised around animals, she knew they should be handled with compassion and respect. Stray cats and dogs were at the time also often hunted and kept in laboratories for operations without anesthetic. Cole became an early anti-vivisectionist and a vegetarian.

In 1886, both sisters became Roman Catholics, Ada taking the name of St Francis of Assisi as her baptismal name. After her sister became a nun, Cole took on private nursing work in the 1890s in the UK and in Europe. When she began to suffer from poor health, she moved to Norwich in 1890 where she worked as a district nurse until 1911 in the St Georges area, a poor district where she set up a club for impecunious Catholic girls. While in Norwich, Cole would visit the Cattle Market where she reprimanded the cattle handlers if she saw them handling the animals with brutality. In 1906, Cole published, with Scientific Press, a booklet on nursing, called Lectures on home nursing for the poor. The booklet is now available as a classic reprint.

In 1910, Cole's health deteriorated and she was diagnosed with pulmonary tuberculosis. She gave up nursing temporarily and moved to Cley-next-the-Sea, on the North Norfolk Coast, in order to rest and get well. In 1911, somewhat recovered, Cole went to visit her younger sister, now the mother of a convent in Antwerp. One day, while passing the docks with her sister, Cole saw lines of horses who, ill and exhausted at the end of their working lives, had been sent from Britain to be disposed of in overseas abattoirs. She was appalled at their brutal treatment. She did not object to the eating of horses or their slaughter for meat per se but wanted more humane conditions for their transport to slaughterhouses. The invention of the internal combustion engine meant that many working horses had become redundant. By 1906, nearly 50,000 worn-out horses per year were being exported on British ships to the continent for meat or vivisection without anesthetic.

Cole researched the situation, working with the RSPCA and the Brussels Society for the Protection of Animals, watching and recording the journeys of horses and mules, often without access to food or water. Once back home again in Cley, she corresponded with relevant authorities and kept detailed records on, for example, the number of animals arriving in Antwerp each year, the number sent to veterinary colleges for vivisection and those slaughtered in abattoirs in Antwerp. She contributed to newspapers, gave public talks and was joined by others in sympathy with her actions and ideals. These included Stephen Coleridge, John Galsworthy and Alfred Munnings. In 1914, largely as a result of her efforts, the first Exportation of Horses Act was passed in Britain. It only limited export to five ports and only prevented horses in very poor health from being exported. Owing to the outbreak of war, it was never really put into effect.

== War work ==
When the first world war broke out in 1914, Cole joined her sister Effie in Belgium. She worked as a Red Cross nurse treating German and allied soldiers. She also helped allied soldiers to escape back to their homes via underground networks that included her sister's convent. Cole also distributed resistance newspapers. She was arrested on August 3, 1918, and held in the Antwerp Military Prison which was also known, jokingly, as the Patriots' Hotel. Interrogated and at times in solitary confinement, she then stood trial on November 1, 1918, and was sentenced to a year in prison in Germany. Saved by the Armistice, she was freed on November 11.

== After the war ==
Cole returned to Britain in 1919. She had kept a diary throughout the war, hiding the texts under the floorboards at the convent. Three articles in the Eastern Daily Press October 1919 were derived from them. These were:

- "Smuggling the boys", Eastern Daily Press 23.10.1919
- "In prison", Eastern Daily Press 16.10.1919
- "Some World War I commemoration services", Eastern Daily Press 13.10.1919.

In 1920, she received, along with her sister who had also been imprisoned, the Decoration Civique or Civic Decoration, a reward for exceptional acts of bravery, devotion or humanity. It was granted to her by Albert king of Belgium for her bravery, self-sacrifice and humanitarian actions during the war.

=== Humane slaughter ===
Although temporarily halted during the wartime hostilities, the transport of unfit horses to the continent for butchery continued after the war, as horse dealers eager for profit found loopholes in the 1914 act. Efforts were made to encourage trade abroad in dead meat instead of live, but freshly killed meat was more popular on the continent. Cole continued to work with help from, for example, the RSPCA, the Belgian SPCA, and Lord Mark Lambourne, to pressure the Minister of Agriculture to improve inspections and slaughter conditions in France and Belgium. Newspaper articles, posters around London and a meeting at the Royal Albert Hall in May 1921, at which Cole spoke, all helped to sway public opinion so that a tax of £20 was levied on every horse, mule or ass exported live from Britain, thus making the trade uneconomic for horse dealers.

In the 1920s, Cole spoke publicly all over the country, gathering high-profile supporters such as John Buchan, who later became Governor General of Canada, and the Swedish anti-vivisectionist Emily Lind-af-Hageby and the Duchess of Hamilton. Her aim was to stop the export of horses completely as it was hard to verify that the slaughter techniques in continental abattoirs were humane. In 1928, Cole founded the International League for the Protection of Horses. In 1929, she established Klondyke Horse Abattoir at Bourne, Lincolnshire, an abattoir designed to slaughter horses humanely. It closed in 1973.

=== RSPCA controversy ===
Cole joined the RSPCA in 1922. In 1925, Cole and Jules Ruhl produced a controversial film for the RSPCA depicting the inhumane slaughter of export horses in Belgium that featured graphic footage taken at the village of Terhagon in 1914. The Departmental Committee of the Ministry of Agriculture alleged that the film featured staged slaughter footage by paid butchers. Cole denied any faked film footage.

Cole and Lady Simon planned a campaign to counteract the statements by the Departmental Committee. However, it was decided by the RSPCA that "it would not be expedient to conduct such a campaign". In July 1925, she was dismissed from the RSPCA for conducting a campaign outside of the Society. She campaigned against the exportation of worn-out horses; work which was not sanctioned by the RSPCA Council. Cole commented that "I could have resigned but I preferred to allow them to dismiss me... the attitude of the R.S.P.C.A. with regard to the traffic in old horses has always been unsatisfactory".

In response she formed the Old Horse Traffic Committee with Lady Simon as chairman. Cole intended to get reinstated in the RSPCA as an organizer for the prevention of traffic in old horses. Edward G. Fairholme, chief secretary of the RPSCA requested for a requisition with at least 150 secured signatures to summon an "extraordinary general meeting". Cole sent requisition papers, signed by over 250 RSPCA members to their headquarters in February 1927. A controversial RSPCA meeting presided by Sir William Gentle was held in June 1927. There was divided opinion about Cole organizing a new special department of the Society to end the practice of exporting horses to Europe for slaughter. There were 173 votes in favour of the resolution and 100 against.

=== International League Against the Export of Horses for Butchery ===
Cole's Old Horse Traffic Committee became the International League Against the Export of Horses for Butchery in 1928. In 1930, Cole moved its offices to Bloomsbury Square. The organization amalgamated with the National Council to Prevent the Export of Horses for Butchery in 1935 and was renamed the International League for Horses. In 1937, it became the International League for the Protection of Horses (ILPH). The League's work has been credited for driving the Exportation of Horses Act which was passed in 1937. Brigadier-General Sir George Cockerill was honorary director of ILPH in 1939. The ILPH was re-branded as World Horse Welfare in 2008.

== Death and legacy ==
Cole died on 17 October 1930, aged 70. Her remains were cremated at Golders Green Crematorium, among those president were Sir Robert Gower of the RSPCA and De Vere Summers.

In 1932, the Ada Cole Memorial Stables, a home for old and ill-treated horses, were established in her memory. Ledgers of the first residents show that some were military horses and mules brought back from fighting on the continent. The stables were merged with Redwings Horse Sanctuary in 2005.

A book about Cole's life titled She Heard Their Cry, written by Joyce Rushen, was published in 1972 by ACMS Publishing.

Parallels have been drawn between Cole and another courageous Norfolk nurse, Edith Cavell, whose execution by Germans in 1915 made all aware of the danger of resistance work.

Ada Cole Avenue in Snetterton was named after her.

Cole's great-nephew was Tom Harrisson.

== Quotations ==
"She heard their cry, and with far-seeing eyes

Undimmed by useless tears, with love aflame,

Challenged the world to end such cruelties."

From a sonnet entitled A Friend in Need on Ada Cole by Sir George Cockerill who became chair of the International League after Cole's death.
