= Cholai =

Illegal alcoholic beverage made in India

Cholai is an illegal alcoholic beverage made in India, equivalent to "hooch" or "bootleg" alcohol. Usually made from rice, it is sometimes mixed with industrial alcohol or methanol, which has resulted in several hundred deaths.

== Preparation ==
The Indian encyclopedia, Bharater Adibasi, has a description of cholai as being a distilled alcohol made with two earthen pots joined together; the lower pot filled with yeast and mixed rice/jaggery; the upper pot left empty with an output tube. When the lower pot is heated, the vapour of 80% alcohol goes to the upper pot and comes into contact with cold air, which distills the vapour to become "cholai".

It is locally made, and sold cheaply and illegally. In 2011, consumption of cholai adulterated with industrial alcohol resulted in the death of over 140 people.

Cholai is also considered a local name, or a variant, of "desi dāru" (Hindi for "country alcohol"), i.e., cheap distilled liquor.
