= Poling (horse) =

Hitting a horse on the legs as it goes over a jump

Poling or rapping is the practice of hitting a horse on the legs as it goes over a jump, to make it think it hit the fence hard (due to the pain), so the animal will pick his legs up higher the next time. It is usually performed using a long bamboo stick, which is smacked on the cannon bones of the horse.

Poling is illegal under FEI rules, as well as under many national rules including the USEA and many other organizations. Show jumpers and hunt seat competitors were the most common users of this technique, as a rail down is often a deciding factor in winning a class. However, the practice is seen today as too painful for the horse.

== In popular culture ==
Poling can be seen in a scene of the movie National Velvet, when Mi Taylor hits the Pie on the legs as Velvet rides him over an obstacle in a training session.

It can also be seen being used by Harry DeLeyer while working with his son's horse in the documentary Harry and Snowman.
