= Cholla (horse) =

Cholla (May 20, 1985 – March 22, 2013 in Nevada, United States) was a mustang-Quarter Horse mix known as the painting horse for his very special ability. Because of his wild temper, the cowboys named him after the cholla cactus.

== Biography ==
After being tamed by cowboys with the sacking out method, at the age of five the horse was bought by Renee Chambers, a trained ballerina, who succeeded in gaining his trust. Many years later, in 2004, his ability to paint was discovered by chance, when he was following his owner painting the corral fence.

The horse used a sturdy easel and some watercolor tins. He appeared to show will, awareness, intention and pleasure when he painted his abstract strokes, straight or curved. He chose the brush and color, then moved the brush in his mouth using his tongue and teeth to determine his preferred angle. Then he started to paint. He might need assistance—and then he would show he wanted to be helped—when the brush accidentally dropped. This behaviour has been studied by scientists and ethologists, and is extraordinary because Cholla was reportedly not trained to do this.

Cholla's paintings were shown in local exhibits in the U.S. In 2008 Cholla received international media exposure when his owner sent one of his earlier artworks (The Big Red Buck, 2004) to a painting competition in Mogliano Veneto, Italy. The jury admitted the artwork, as the competition is "open to everyone". The horse was awarded an Honor Mention of the Jury, without receiving any money reward, and the artwork was exhibited together with the 30 finalists'.

As part of the prize regulations, some partner galleries had been given the chance to grant a special prize (a solo exhibit for free) to one or more finalist; the Giudecca 795 contemporary art gallery based in Venice, besides the two human artists Benny Katz and James King, decided to also award Cholla with a "personal" exhibit (the first overseas) and a catalogue (the first ever), considering him a very special and "young" artist. The Venice exhibit occurred from 24 April to 15 September 2009 and displayed 30 original watercolors painted between 2004 and 2009, and some video showing the horse painting. (Some video is also available online.) The horse's owner and the gallerists decided not to transport the horse from Nevada to Venice; such a big and wild horse would have been exposed to unnecessary risks and injuries.

Some original watercolors by Cholla have been shown on preview at Palazzo dei Congressi, Rome, April 2009. Some of Cholla's artwork has been sold. Renee Chambers is actively contributing to animal charities including helping the wild mustangs in Nevada. Cholla died on 22 March 2013 at nearly 28.

Other animals have created artwork as well. Congo, a chimpanzee, was the first animal-artist to be 'discovered'. Congo was observed by Desmond Morris, and impressed Picasso and Salvador Dalí. Cholla's story could be similar to the painting chimp's, Italian ethologist Danilo Mainardi says. Cholla's creativity is held in contrast to the trained and repetitive gestures of the so-called elephant artists, who look trained to repeat gestures with their flexible trunks.

== See also ==
- Jumping Cholla, the cactus after which Cholla was named
