= World Horse Welfare =

British horse welfare organisation

- Established: 1927
- Founder: Ada Cole (1860–1930)
- Founded at: London, UK
- Type: Nonprofit
- Registration no.: 206658 and SC038384
- Website: worldhorsewelfare.org
- Formerly called: International League for the Protection of Horses

World Horse Welfare is a registered charity in the United Kingdom that was previously named the International League for the Protection of Horses. Anne, Princess Royal is its patron.

== History ==
International League for the Protection of Horses was founded in 1927 as a campaigning organisation to prevent the export of live British horses for slaughter. The charity's founder, Ada Cole, was spurred into action after witnessing a procession of British work horses being unloaded and whipped for four miles to slaughter in Belgium.

The Irish branch was founded in 1928 by Eleanor Whitton.

In 1937 after political lobbying by the charity, the Exportation of Horses Act was introduced to protect the welfare of horses destined for the slaughterhouses of Europe. This introduced the concept of 'Minimum Values', which effectively stops the export of live horses for slaughter from Great Britain.

The charity opened its first horse rehabilitation centre in Britain, in 1949, and started its first international training course in Morocco in 1985.

In 2008, the organisation was renamed to World Horse Welfare.

== Activities ==
World Horse Welfare works in the United Kingdom in recovering, rehabilitating and rehoming horses. The charity has 16 full-time field officers based around the UK who investigate concerns reported by the general public.

Horses needing attention are taken into one of the charity's four Recovery and Rehabilitation Centres, based in Norfolk, Somerset (the Glenda Spooner Farm), Lancashire and Aberdeenshire.

The charity works in the developing world, training local people in skills such as saddlery, farriery, nutrition and horse management.

World Horse Welfare campaigns to achieve welfare improvements through changing policy, practices and attitudes.
