= List of writers on horsemanship =

This is a list of writers on horsemanship and equitation and their principal published works; some minor works may have been omitted. Usually only the first edition of each work is shown; subsequent editions are shown only if the title was changed. Titles of some works may be abbreviated. Full bibliographical details are not given. Authors are listed by default in order of the date of the first published work; works for each author are listed in order of date of the first known edition.

== Before 1700 ==
Author	Principal works	Original language	Notes
Kikkuli	• (unnamed text), c. 1360 BC	Hittite	Earliest known treatise on horsemanship, detailed the training and conditioning of chariot horses
Simon of Athens	• De re equestris (fragments)	Ancient Greek	cited by Xenophon
Xenophon (427–355 BC)	• On Horsemanship • Hipparchicus	Ancient Greek	
Jordanus Rufus de Calabria	• De medicina equorum, ca. 1250–1256 Full text: ca. 1400; Full text: 1818 edition	Latin, German, Italian, French	
Lorenzo Rusio	• Liber marescalcie equorum, 1320 Full text: ca. 1400; Full text: ca. 1400–1500; Full text: 1532 edition; Full text: 1531 edition	Latin, Italian, French	
Edward, King of Portugal (1391–1438)	• Leal Consselheiro, Livro da enssynança de bem cavalgar toda sela, 1437 Full text: 1401–1450; Full text: 1854 edition	Portuguese	King of Portugal
Leon Battista Alberti	• De equo animante, 1468 Full text: 1890 edition	Latin	
Manuel Dies	• Libre de la menescaha, ca. 1424–1436 Full text: 1515 edition	Catalan, Castilian, French	
Heinrich Münsinger	• Buch von den Falken, Sperbern, Pferden und Hunden, 1475 Full text: 1475 edition	German	
Anonymous	• Spraua a lekarstua końskie przez Conrada królewskiego kowala doswiadcżone : nowo s pilnosczią przełożone, a napirwey o poznaniu dobrego konia, 1532 1905 edition	Polish	
Federico Grisone	• Gli ordini di cavalcare, "The rules of riding", 1550 Full text of 1551 edition • Razze del Regno, raccolte in questo volume brevemente da frederigo grisone gentilhuomo napoletano/ Dove appresso dona molti belli avisi convenienti alla cognitione de i polletri et al governo et reggere di ogni cavallo, 16th century • L'ecuirie du S. Federic Grison gentilhomme napolitain, translation by François de Lorraine, duc de Guise, 1559 1559 edition; 1575 edition; Full text: 1579 edition • A newe booke, containing the arte of ryding, and breakinge greate Horses, translation by Thomas Blundeville, [1560?] • Künstlicher Bericht und allerzierlichste Beschreybung des edeln, uhesten, unnd hochberümbten Ehrn Friderici Grisonis neapolitanischen hochlöblichen Adels, translation by Johann Fayser den Jüngern von Arnstain, 1570 Full text: 1573 edition	Italian	
Cesare Fiaschi	• Trattato dell'imbrigliare, maneggiare, et ferrare cavalli..., 1556 Full text: 1556 edition; 1563 edition	Italian	
Giovanni Battista Ferraro	• Delle razze, disciplina del cavalcare, ed altre cose pertinenti ad essercitio cosi fatto, 1560 Full text: 1560 edition	Italian	
Claudio Corte	• Il cavallerizzo di Messer Claudio Corte di Pavia : nel quale si tratta della natura de' cavalli del modo di domargli, et frenargli, e di tutto quello, che à cavalli, et à buon cavalerizzo s'appartiene 1562 Full text of Venice 1573 edition; another copy; Lyon 1573 edition • The art of riding conteining diuerse necessarie instructions, demonstrations, helps, and corrections appertaining to horsemanship, not herettofore expressed by anie other author: written at large in the Italian toong, by Maister Claudio Corte, a man most excellent in this art. Here brieflie reduced into certeine English discourses to the benefit of gentlemen and others desirous of such knowledge, translation by Thomas Bedingfield, 1584 Full text: 1584 edition	Italian	
Pasqual Caracciolo	• La gloria del cavallo, "The Glory of the Horse", 1566 Full text: 1566 edition; 1567 edition; 1608 edition • Discorso de'freni, et de' maneggi, 16th century Full text: 1568 edition	Italian	
Pedro de Aguilar	• Tractado de la Cavalleria de la Gineta, 1572 Full text: 1572 edition	Spanish	
Marco de Pavari	• Escurie de M. de Pavari venitien (en ital. et en franç.), 1581 Full text: 1581 edition	Italian, French	
Markus Fugger	• Von der Gestüterey: Das ist Ein gründtliche beschreibung wie vnnd wa [!] man ein Gestüt von guten edlen Kriegsrossen auffrichten, vnderhalten, vnd wie man die jungen von einem Jar zu dem andern erziehen soll..., 1584 Full text: 1584 edition ]	German	
Anonymous	• Von Zeumen, Gründtlicher Bericht des Zeumens vnd ordentliche Außteilung der Mündtstück vnd Stangen, wie dieselbenn nach eines jeden Pferdts arth vnd eigenschafft sollenn gebrauchtt werden, 1588 Full text: 1588 edition	German	Published anonymously, Georg Engelhard von Löhneysen claims to have written it
Hans Kreutzberger	• Eigentliche, Wolgerissene Contrafactur und Formen der Gebiß für allerley Mängel, auch underrichtung der Pferdt, 1591 Full text: 1591 edition	German	
John Astley ([1507]–1595)	• The Art of Riding, set foorth in a breefe treatise, with a due interpretation of certeine places alledged out of Xenophon, and Gryson ... wherein also the true vse of the hand by the said Grysons rules and precepts is speciallie touched ... Lastlie, is added a short discourse of the chaine or cauezzan, the trench, and the martingale: written by a gentleman of great skill and long experience in the said art, 1595	English	Master of Her Majesty's Jewel House
Salomon de La Broue (1530–1610)	• Preceptes Principavx Qve les bons Caualerisses doiuent exactement obseruer en leurs Escole, "Principal precepts that good riders must exactly observe in their schools", 1593 • Le cavalerice françois: contenant les preceptes...(revised and expanded edition of the Preceptes ...), 1602 Full text: 1610 edition; Full text of 1646 edition, vol 1; vol 2; vol 3	French	pupil of Giovanni Battista Pignatelli
Gervase Markham (ca. 1568–1637)	• A Discourse of Horsemanshippe, 1593 • Cavalarice, or the English horseman : contayning all the art of horse-manship, as much as is necessary for any man to understand ... together, with the discovery of the subtil trade or mystery of hors-coursers..., 1607 Full text: 1617 edition, volume 1; Full text: volume 2; Full text: volume 3; Full text: volume 4; Full text: volume 5; Full text: volume 6; Full text: volume 7; Full text: volume 8	English	
Ottaviano Siliceo	• Scuola de' cavalieri di Ottaviano Siliceo gentiluomo Troiano, nella quale... si discorre... de' cavalli, in che mode si debbono disciplinare, & conservare, 1598	Italian	
Alfonso Ruggieri	• Ordine di cavalcare et amaistrare cavalli, dar loro lettione, secondo le qualità e disposittione di ciascheduno, cominciando da che son poledri, 1598	Italian	
Caspar Reuschlein	• Hippopronia: grundtlicher vnnd eigentlicher Bericht inn zwey Bücher verfasset : erstlichen, von Art vnd Eygenschafft der Pferde, wie die auff allerhand vnd vilfaltige Manieren vnd Weisen zu zeumen vnnd abzurichten..., 1599 Full text: 1599 edition	German	
Alessandro Massari Malatesta	• Compendio dell'heroica arte di Cavalleria, 1599 Full text: 1600 edition • Tractaus de modo equos fraenandi... cum diversorym fraenorum figuris, 1607 • Della ragione e modi d'imbrigliar Cavalli: con una copiosa raccolta di varie figure di Briglie, cioè, di Morsi, Guardie, Barbazzali, e Capezzoni, 1613, Italian version of the 1607 Latin text	Italian, Latin	
Anonymous	• Bellissimi Secreti da Cavalli, di Pignatello. Diffinitione che vuol dir Arte veterali, o vero Mareschalchena, End 16th century, beginning 17th century	Italian	
Lelio Cinquini	• Il cavallo ammaestrato - Opera di Lelio Cinquini, nobile romano, Cameriero Secreto di Spada e Cappa della Santità di Nostro Signore Papa Paolo V, 16th century	Italian	
Valerio Piccardini	• Scritti di Cavaleria, ca. 1600 Full text	Italian	
Lorenzino Palmieri	• Perfette regole et modi di caualcare, ca. 1600 Full text: ca. 1600 edition • Perfette regole et modi di caualcare. Dove con chiarezza si mostra e con facilità s'insegna come si possi ridurre ogni cavallo all'intera perfettione: Et insieme si tratta della natura de' cavalli, si propongono le loro infermità e s'additano gli Rimedi per curarle, 1625 Full text: 1625 edition	Italian	
Anonymous	• Gospodarstwo jezdeckie, strzelcze, y mysliwcze, 1690 Full text: 1854 edition	Polish	
Pirro Antonio Ferraro	• Cavallo frenato di Pirro Antonio Ferraro Napolitano ... Diuiso in quattro libri / Con discorsi notabili, sopra briglie, antiche, & moderne nel primo; nel secondo molte altre da lui inuentate; nel terzo vn dialogo ..., 1602 Full text: 1602 edition • Libro di Mariscalcheria, 16 century Full text	Italian	
Krzysztof Mikołaj Dorohostajski (1562–1615)	• Hippica To Iest O Koniach Xięgi, 1603 Full text: 1603 edition	Polish	
Don Giovanni de Gamboa	• Ragione dell’arte di cavalcare, nella quale si insegna quanto conviene di sapere ad un cavaliero a cavallo, 1606 Full text: 1606 edition	Italian	
Krzysztof Pieniążek	• Hippika albo Sposob Poznania, Chowania Y Stanowienia Koni, 1607 Full text: 1607 edition	Polish	
Georg Engelhard von Löhneysen	• Della Cavalleria Das ist: Gründlicher vnd außführlicher Bericht, von allem was zu der löblichen Reuterey gehörig, vnd einem Cavallier zu wissen von nöhten..., 1609 Full text: 1624 edition • Neu-eröffnete Hof-Kriegs- und Reit-Schul,... , 1729 Full text: 1729 edition	German	
Nicolas Morgan of Crolane	• The perfection of horse-manship, 1609	English	
Michael Baret	• An Hipponomie, Or the Vineyard of Horsemanship, 1618	English	
René de Menou de Charzinay (1578–1651)	• La Pratique du cavalier, par où il est enseigné la vraye méthode qu'il doit tenir pour mettre son cheval à la raison..., 1614 Full text: 1614 edition; Full text: 1651 edition	French	also published works of Antoine de Pluvinel
Christoff Jacob Liebens	• Christoff Jacob Liebens Chur- und Fürstlichen Sächsischen gewesenen Bereiter und Stallmeisters sel. kurtz gefastes Reit-Buch, 1616 Full text: ca. 1670 edition • Practica et arte di cavalleria, of Oeffeningh en konst des rydens, leerende een berijder de paerden nae haer natuer en aert t'onderwijsen en af te richten... , 1671 Full text: 1671 edition, vol. 1 & 2; Full text: 1671 edition, vol. 3	German, Dutch	
Alfonso Macetti	• Regole de osservarsi nel cavalcare, 1621	Italian	
Pierre de la Noue	• La cavalerie françoise et italienne, ou, L'art de bien dresser les chevaux, selon les preceptes des bonnes écoles des deux nations : tant pour le plaisir de la carriere, et des carozels que pour le service de la guerre, 1620 Full text: 1620 edition	French	
Antoine de Pluvinel (1552–1620)	• Le maneige royal, "The royal manège", 1623 • L’Instruction du Roy en l’Exercise de Monter a Cheval (new edition of the Maneige ...), 1625 Full text: 1660 edition; Full text of Amsterdam 1666 edition; Second link to full text of 1666 edition	French	pupil of Giovanni Battista Pignatelli, tutor to King Louis XIII
Baldovino da Monte Simoncelli	• Il Cesarino ovvero dell'arte di cavalcare Dialogo, 1625 Full text: 1625 edition	Italian	
Giovanni Paolo D’Aquino	• Disciplina del cavallo con l'vso del Piliere, dialoghi di Frà Gio. Paolo d'Aquino..., 1630 Full text: 1636 edition	Italian	
Ernst Abraham von Dehn	• Kurtze doch eigendliche vnd gründliche Beschreibung von abrichtung vnd Zäumung der Rosse..., 1637 Full text: 1637 edition	German	
Francesco Liberati	• La Perfettione del cavallo, 1639	Italian	
Robert Ward	• Animadversions of warre; or a militarie magazine of the truest rules, and ablest instructions, for the managing of warre : composed of the most refined discipline, and choice experiments that these late Netherlandish, and Swedish warres have produced. With divers new inventions, both of fortifications and strategems. As also sundry collections taken out of the most approved authors, ancient and moderne, either in greeke, latine, italian, french, spanish, dutch or english. In two books / by Robert Ward, gentleman and commander, 1639 Full text: 1639 edition	English	
Baumann Budownicki, Jan	• Joannis Bavman Bvdownicki Eqvestria Sive De Arte Eqvitandi Libri Dvo, 1640 Full text: 1640 edition	Latin	
Giovanni Battista Galiberto	• Il Cavallo da maneggio, libro... diviso in tre parti, nella prima si tratta del conoscer li cavalli, nella seconda il modo di cavalcare, nella terza il modo di medicar' ogni sorte d'infirmità..., 1650 Full text: 1650 edition • Neugebahnter Tummelplatz vnd eröffnete Reitschul Sambt beygefügter Gestüttordnung vnd gründlicher Einzäumung, wie auch der Pferde Cur vnd Artzney, 1660 Full text: 1660 edition	Italian	
William Cavendish, 1st Duke of Newcastle (1592–1676)	• La methode nouvelle et invention extraordinaire de dresser les chevaux, 1658 Full text: 1658 edition; full text of second edition, 1737 • A New Method and Extraordinary Invention to Dress Horses and Work them according to Nature..., 1667 • A general system of horsemanship in all it’s branches : containing a faithful translation [from the French] of that most noble and useful work of his Grace, William Cavendish, Duke of Newcastle..., 1743 Full text: 1743 edition	French	Master of Horse to Charles II of England
Gabriel de Hollande Breuil Pompée	• Abrégé des Sciences en general, 1660 Full text: 1669 edition • Traité de l'instruction du Cavalier, pour le rendre capable de dresser toutes sortes de Chevaux, 1669 Full text: 1669 edition	French	
Samuel Fouquet	• Le modele du cavalier françois, divisé en trois parties. Dédié, à... Heny prince de Nassau... par messire Fouquet escuier sieur de Beaurepere, gentil-homme de la province d'Anjou, escuier de la grande escurie du Roy, 1665 Full text: 1665 edition	French	
..., Delcampe	• L’Art de monter à Cheval, 1664 • Le noble Art de Monter à Cheval, 1671 • L'art de monter à cheval : pour elever la noblesse dans les plus beaux airs du manege, 1690 Full text: 1691 edition • Die edle Reit-Kunst oder schöne und leichte Anleitung ein guter Reiter zu werden : Auch was man beym Ringel-rennen, Lanzen-brechen und Kopff-rennen zu beobachten, 1698 Full text: 1698 edition	French	
Jacques de Solleysel	• Le Véritable Parfait Mareschal, qui enseigne à connoistre la beauté, la bonté & les deffauts des Chevaux, 1672 Full text: 1672 edition • Der vollkommene Stall-Meister, welcher lehret, die Schönheit, die Güte und Mängel der Pferd zuerkennen... , 1706 Full text: 1706 edition • The compleat horseman : or, perfect farrier : in two parts..., 1717 Full text: 1717 edition	French	
Georg Simon Winter von Adlersflügel (1629–1701)	• Georg Simon Winters neuer Tractat von der Reith-Kunst : in zwey Haupt-Theil unterschieden; der erste handelt, wie man einen grossen Herrn, Cavallier und Scholarn solle unterweisen, zu Pferd zu sitzen ..., der andere, von der Bestellung eines wolerbauten Marstalls ... , 1674 Full text: 1674 edition • Georgii Simonis Winteri, Bellerophon, sive, Eques peritus: hoc est, artis equestris accuratissima institutio : opere bipartito, seu duobus libris, absoluta..., 1674 Full text: 1674 edition	German	
António Galvão de Andrade	• Arte da cavallaria de gineta, e estardiota, bom primor de ferrar, & alveitaria : dividida em tres tratados, 1678 Full text: 1678 edition	Portuguese	
Anonymous	• Regole per ben cavalcare, 1685	Italian	Only known through bibliographic reference in Biblioteca italiana by Nicola Francesco
Giovanni Battista Persa	• Il cavallo ammaestrato, 1688	Italian	
Johann Christoph Pinter	• Neuer, vollkommener, verbesserter und ergäntzter Pferd-Schatz. In einer ausführlichen, leicht-verständ- und begreifflichen, aus reiffer Durchforschung der Natur und untrüglicher Erfahrung geschöpfter Wissenscha, 1688 Full text: 1688 edition	German	
Wolf Helmhardt von Hohberg	• Die Vollkommene Pferd- und Reit-Kunst : samt auszführlichem Unterricht der Edlen Stutery : Darinnen vorgestellet werden Die unterschiedliche Arten/ Schönheit/ Güte/ Mängel/ Zäum- Beschlag- und übrige Wartung der Pferde, 1689 Full text: 1689 edition	German	
Nicola e Luigi Santapaulina	• L'arte del cavallo di Nicola e Luigi Santapaulina..., 1696 Full text: 1696 edition	Italian	
Giovanni Battista Trutta	• Novello giardino della prattica, ed esperienza di Gio. Batista Trutta napolitano. Divisa in tre libri ..., 1699 Full text: 1785 edition	Italian	

== 1700 to 1799 ==
Author	Principal works	Original language	Notes
Gregorio de Zúñiga y Arista	• Doctrina del cavallo y arte de enfrenar dedicada al Serenissimo Señor Don Juan, Principe de Portugal y del Brasil, 1705 Full text: 1705 edition	Spanish	
Giuseppe D’Alessandro	• Opera di d. Giuseppe D'Alessandro duca di Peschiolanciano divisa in cinque libri. Ne' quali si tratta delle regole di cavalcare, della professione di spada, ed altri esercizj d'armi, con figure di briglie, torni, e bisce, ed altro a cio appartenente..., 1711 Full text: 1723 edition	Italian	
Alfonsus Guerini de Preville	• La science de la cavallerie, 1717 Full text: 1717 edition	French	
Niccolò Rosselmini (died 1772)	• Il Cavallo perfetto. Trattato in cui si descrive, quali esser debbano le qualità del cavallo perfetto, e con quai mezzi si arrivi a renderlo tale: opera ... di Niccolo Rossermini ..., 1723 Full text: 1723 edition • Apologia del cavallo perfetto, 1630 • Dell'obbedienza del cavallo: trattato..., 1764 Full text: 1764 edition • Lettera critica ed istruttiva di Niccolo Rosselmini, 1767	Italian	
François Robichon de La Guérinière (1688–1751)	• Ecole de Cavallerie: contenant un Recueil ou abregé Methodique des Principes qui regardent la connoissance des Chevaux... [S.l] Mernier 1730 • Ecole de cavalerie contenant l'ostéologie etc. Sieur de La Guérinière, 4e leçon, Paris 1731 • École de cavalerie, contenant la connoissance, l'instruction et la conservation du cheval, avec figures en taille douce, par M. de La Guérinière... Paris: impr. de J. Collombat 1733 Full text of volume 1, 1736 edition; volume 2 • Elémens de cavalerie: Contenant la connoissance du cheval, l'embouchure, la ferrure, la selle, &c. avec un traité du haras, Paris: chez les frères Guerin, 1741 • Manuel de Cavalerie: ou l'on enseigne... la connoissance du Cheval l'embouchure... l'osteologie du cheval, ses maladies, & leurs remedes… La Haye: Chez Jean Van Duren 1742 (same as the above, according to Brunet) Full text • Escuela de a caballo..., translated by Baltasar de Irurzun, 1787 Full text: 1787 edition • Die Reitkunst oder gründliche Anweisung zur Kenntniß der Pferde, deren Erziehung, Unterhaltung, translated by J. D. Knoell, 1791 Full text: 1791 edition • A treatise upon horsemanship, translated from the original French of M. de la Gueriniere, translated by Captain William Frazer, 1801 Full text: 1801 edition	French	
Baron d'Eisenberg	• L'Art de monter à cheval, ou Description du manège moderne dans sa perfection, expliqué par des leçons necessaires, 1733 Full text: 1733 edition; 1759 edition • La perfezione e i difetti del cavallo opera del barone d' Eisemberg direttore e primo cavallerizzo dell'Accademia di Pisa, dedicata alla sacra cesarea real maestà dell'augustissimo... Francesco 1..., 1753 Full text: 1753 edition • Des Barons von Eisenberg, ersten Stallmeisters und Directors der kaiserl. Akademie, entdeckte Roßtäuscherkünste zur Vermeidung der Betrügereyen bey dem Pferdekaufen, translated by Johann Friedrich Rosenzweig, 1780 Full text: 1780 edition	French	
Manuel Alvarez Ossorio y Vega	• La scuola moderna nel maneggio de' cavalli profittevole a chiunque esercita questa nobile virtù, 1733 Full text: 1733 edition	Italian	
Guiseppe Antonio Marinelli	• La scuola moderna nel maneggio de' cavalli, 1733 •Manejo real : en que se propone lo que deben saber los cavalleros en esta Facultad, para llenar con la practica..., 1741 Full text: 1741 edition	Spanish	
Claude Bourgelat	• Le Nouveau Newcastle ou nouveau traité de Cavalerie geometrique theorique et pratique, 1744 Full text: 1744 edition; 1744 • A new system of horsemanship, translation by Richard Berenger 1754 Full text: 1754 edition • Nouveau systéme de cavalerie, ou traité du manége réduit a ses principes naturels, 1760 Full text: 1760 edition	French	
Gaspard de Saunier (1663–1748)	• Les vrais principes de la cavalerie, 1749 Full text: 1749 edition • L'art de la cavalerie, ou La manière de devenir bon écuyer . Par des règles aisées... accompagné de principes certains pour le choix des chevaux... avec une idée générale de leurs maladies..., 1756 Full text: 1756 edition	French	
de Chevigny	• Science des personnes de cour, d'épée et de robe. Tome 6, Partie 1... Qui contient... la connoissance des differentes espèces de Chevaux, leurs qualités, la manière de les traiter, de les exercer, les tournois, les joutes, les carousels, le manege ou l’art de monter à cheval, 1752 Full text: 1752 edition	French	
Joseph Cristoph Zehentner	• Kurzer und deutlicher Unterricht zur Anweisung eines jungen Cavaliers im Reiten : dergestalt, daß er sein Pferd von Hand zu Hand reiten, oder zu aller Zeit wechseln könne, 1753 Full text: 1761 edition	German	
Michael Gottlieb Griesbach	• Die Edle Reit-Kunst : mit Kupfern und einem Anhange von der Ross-Artzeney, 1755 Full text: 1755 edition	German	
Johann Elias Ridinger	• Vorstellung und Beschreibung derer Schul und Campagne Pferden nach ihren Lectionen, In was vor gelegenheiten solche können gebraucht werden, 1760 Full text: 1760 edition	German, French	
José de Barros Paiva e Moraes Pona	• Manejo real, escola moderna da cavallaria da brida: em que se propoem os ..., 1762 Full text: 1762 edition	Portuguese	
Johann Baptist von Sind (1709–1776)	• Des Freyherrn von Sind ... Vollstandiger Unterricht in den Wissenschaften..., 1770 Full text: 1770 edition • L' art du manège pris dans ses vrais principes : suivi d'une nouvelle méthode pour l'embouchure des chevaux, et d'une connoissance abrégée des principales maladies auxquelles ils sont sujets, ainsi que du traitement qui leur est propre, 1774 Full text: 1774 edition • Die kunst pferde zu zaumen und zu beschlagen... , 1782 Full text: 1782 edition	German, French	
Louis-Charles Mercier Dupaty de Clam (1774–1782)	• Traités sur l'équitation, par M. Dupaty de Clam, ... , 1771 Full text: 1771 edition • La science et l'art de l'équitation, démontrés d'après la nature; ou Théorie et pratique de l'équitation, fondées sur l'anatomie, la méchanique, la géométrie, & la physique, 1776 Full text: 1776 edition	French	
Richard Berenger (1720–1782)	• The history and art of horsemanship, 1771 Full text: 1771 edition, vol. 1; vol. 2	English	Collection of works of numerous authors, such as Xenophon and Claude Bourgelat, translated into English
Augustin Mottin de la Balme	• Essais sur l'équitation : ou, Principes raisonnés sur l'art de monter et de dresser les chevaux, 1773 Full text: 1773 edition	French	
Johann Gottfried Prizelius	• Vollständige Pferdewissenschaft, 1777 Full text: 1777 edition Full text	German	
Vincenzo Lombardi	• Modo facile, o sieno alcune brevi e principali regole per domare cavalli, 1778	Italian	
Montfaucon de Rogles (17..–1774)	• Traité d'équitation. Par feu M. de Montfaucon de Rogles, écuyer ordinaire de la petite Écurie du roi, commandant de l'Équipage de feu Monseigneur le Dauphin, 1778 Full text: 1778 edition; Full text: 1810 edition	French	
Filippo Invernizzi	• De Fraenis eorumque generibus et partibus apud veteres, 1785	Latin	
Charles Joseph Panckoucke	• Encyclopédie méthodique. Arts académiques . Équitation, escrime, danse, et art de nager, 1786 Full text: 1786 edition	French	
Manuel Carlos de Andrade (1755–1817)	• Luz da Liberal e Nobre Arte da Cavallaria, 1790 Full text: 1790 edition	Portuguese	
Johann Markus Beyer	• Reitkunst zum Selbstunterricht : nebst einer Abhandlung von den Krankheiten der Pferde und ihren Kuren, 1792 Full text: 1792 edition	German	
Michele Sailer	• Del cavalcare riflessioni critico-didascaliche, 1793 Full text: 1793 edition	Italian	
Pasquali di Venezia	• Il perfetto cavallerizzo, 1799	Italian	
Anonymous	• Regola del cavalcare, da Papaleeni, cavallerizzo del gran duca di Toscana, 17th century	Italian	

== 1800 to 1899 ==
Author	Principal works	Original language	Notes
Philip Astley (1742–1814)	• Astley's system of equestrian education : exhibiting the beauties and defects of the horse, with serious and important observations on his general excellence, preserving him in health, grooming, ... 1801 Full text: 1801 edition	English	
Federigo Mazzuchelli (1747–1805)	• Elementi di cavallerizza, 1802 • Scuola Equestre... Nuova edizione, corredata di molti rami... 1805 Full text: 1805 edition, vol. 1; vol. 2	Italian	
Ludwig Hünersdorf	• Anleitung zu der natürlichsten und leichtesten Art Pferde abzurichten : Für Liebhaber des Reitens aus dem Militär- und Civilstande; Nebst einem Anhang, wie diese Anleitung auf die Abrichtung des Cavalleriepferdes und den gemeinen Reiter anzuwenden ist 1805 Full text: 1805 edition	German	
John Adams	• An analysis of horsemanship : teaching the whole art of riding, in the manege, military, hunting, racing, and travelling system : together with the method of breaking horses, for every purpose to which those noble animals are adapted 1805 Full text: 1805 edition	English	
Giovanni Campagnola	• Sulla rigenerazione della razze de'cavalli e sulla equitazione 1810	Italian	
Stefano Arcellazzi	• Lezioni di cavallerizza 1813	Italian	
Maximilian Weyrother	• Anleitung wie man nach bestimmten Verhältnissen die passendste Stangen-Zäumung finden Kann: nebst einer einfachen Ansicht der Grundsätze der Zäumung Wien: Auf Kosten des Verfassers in Commission bei Schaumburg 1814; revised 2nd edition 1826 "Instructions on how to find the most appropriate bit for given conditions..." • De l'embouchure du cheval, ou, Méthode por trouver la meilleure forme de mors, d'aprés les proportions et les principes les plus simples de l'embouchure du cheval: suivie de la description d'une bride qui empêche le cheval de se cabrer A Paris: Chez Anselin, successeur de Magimel, librarie pour l'art militaire 1828 (translation of the above) • Bruchstücke aus den hinterlassenen Schriften des k. k. österr. Oberbereiters Max Ritter von Weyrother 1836	German	director of the Spanish Riding School
Enrico Conti	• L'ipposiade o L'accademico equestre 1823	Italian	
Antonio Locatelli	• Il perfetto cavaliere 1825	Italian	
François Baucher (1796–1873)	• Dictionnaire raisonné d'équitation, "Reasoned dictionary of equitation" 1833 Full text • Dialogues sur l'équitation: premier dialogue entre le grand Hippo-théo, dieu des quadrupèdes, un cavalier et un cheval (with Louis Charles Pellier), "Dialogues on equitation: a first dialogue between the great 'Hippo-théo', god of quadrupeds, a rider and a horse" 1835 31pp. Full text • Passe-temps équestres: suivis de notes explicatives, "Equestrian pastimes: followed by explanatory notes" 1840 • Méthode d'équitation basée sur de nouveaux principes, "Method of riding based on new principles" 1842 Full text • Methode der Reitkunst nach neuen Grundsätzen (translation by von Willisen of the Méthode d'équitation) 1843 • Erläuterndes Wörterbuch der Reitkunst (translation by H. Ritgen of the Dictionnaire raisonné) 1844	French	
Count Antoine Cartier D'Aure (1799–1863)	• Traité d'équitation, par M. le Vte d'Aure..., "Treatise of equitation" 1834 • Observations sur la nouvelle méthode d'équitation, par M. le Vte d'Aure, "Observations on the new method of riding" 1842 • Cours d'équitation, "Course of equitation" 1853	French	
Carlo le Maire	• Nuovo trattato d'equitazione 1843	Italian	
C.G. Gloria	• Le resistenze e le difese del cavallo da sella, dal punto di vista dell'equitazione militare 1873	Italian	
Manfredo Cagni	• Nozioni elementari per la cavalleria 1878	Italian	
Achille Angelini	• Corso magistrale di equitazione saggio d'un maestro per l'instruzione degli allievi e della maestre nelle ippiche discipline 1881	Italian	
Cesare Paderni	• Regole di equitazione sul modo di saltare e superare ostacoli 1883	Italian	
Gustav Steinbrecht (1808–1885)	• Das Gymnasium des Pferdes, "The Gymnasium of the Horse" 1886	German	
James Fillis	• Principes de dressage et d'équitation, "Principles of dressage and of riding" 1890 Full text of 2nd edition, 1891 • Breaking and Riding 1890 (English translation of the Principes) • Grundsätze der Dressur und Reitkunst. Ins Deutsch uebertragen von M. von Zansen gen. van der Osten,... 2te Auflage... von Gustav Goebel... 1896 (German translation of the Principes) • Journal de dressage, "Journal of dressage" 1903	French	
Eugenio Martinengo Cesaresco	• L'arte di cavalcare, con aggiunta, il cavallo attaccato alla carrozza 1894	Italian	
Eva Christy (1869–1954)	• Side-Saddle Riding: A Practical Handbook for Horsewomen 1899 • Cross-Saddle and Side-Saddle: Modern Riding for Men and Women 1932 • If Wishes Were Horses Beggars Could Ride 1947	English	

== 1900 to 1999 ==
Author	Principal works	Original language	Notes
Wilhelm Müseler 1887–1952	• Reitlehre 1933 (2nd edition) • Riding Logic 1937	German	
Henry Wynmalen	• Equitation ... Illustrated from photographs 1938 • Horse Breeding & Stud Management 1950 • Dressage: A study of the finer points of riding 1953 • The Horse in Action 1954 • Horse breeding and stud management 1971	English	Aficionado of the "French school" of dressage
Alois Podhajsky (1898–1973)	Spanische Hofreitschule Wien, "The Spanish Riding School of Vienna" [1941] • The Spanish Riding Academy, Vienna, Austria 1947 • Die spanische Hofreitschule; The Spanish Riding school; L' Ecole d'équitation espagnole, 1948 • The Complete Training of Horse and Rider 1965 • My Dancing White Horses 1966 • My Horses My Teachers 1967 • The Riding Teacher 1973 • The Art of Dressage: Basic Principles of Riding and Judging 1976	German	director of the Spanish Riding School from 1939
Waldemar Seunig	• Von der Koppel bis zur Kapriole, die Ausbildung des Reitpferdes 1949 • Horsemanship: a complete book on training the horse and its rider 1956 (translation of the above)	German	
Nuno Oliveira (1925–1989)	Haute ećole: forty-three photographs of horses taught and mounted by Nuno Oliviera London: J.A. Allen 1965 • Réflexions sur l'art équestre. Traduit du portugais par René Bacharach [1965] • Reflections on equestrian art (translated [from the French] by Phyllis Field) 1976 • Classical principles of the art of training horses (illustrated by Fernando Abreu) 1983 • Classical principles of the art of training horses, volume 2: From an old master trainer to young trainers 1986 • Les Chevaux et leurs cavaliers 1987 • Horses and their riders (with Joy Howley) 1988 • L'art équestre 1991	Portuguese, French	
Reiner Klimke (1936–1999)	Cavaletti. Ausbildung von Reiter und Pferd über Bodenricks 1966 • Military: Geschichte, Training, Wettkampf 1967, "Eventing" • Cavalletti: Schooling of Horse and Rider over Ground Rails (translation of Cavaletti by Daphne Machin Goodall) 1969 • Le Concours complet: histoire, entraînement, compétition (translation of Military by Pierre André) 1977 • Grundausbildung des jungen Reitpferdes: von der Fohlenerziehung bis zum ersten Turnierstart 1980 • Horse trials (translation of Military by Daphne Machin Goodall) 1984 • Ahlerich von der Remonte zum Dressur-Weltmeister; ein exemplarischer Ausbildungsweg 1984 • Basic Training of the Young Horse: From the Education of the Young Foal to the First Competition (translation of Grundausbildung by Sigrid Young) 1985 • Ahlerich: The Making of a Dressage World Champion (translation of Ahlerich by Courtney Searls-Ridge) 1986 • Von der Schönheit der Dressur vom jungen Pferd bis zum Grand Prix 1991 • Klimke on Dressage: From the Young Horse Through Grand Prix (translation of the above by Courtney Searls-Ridge and Jan Spauschus Johnson) 1992	German	Olympic medalist who went on to teach and write extensively with co-author Ingrid Klimke
Egon von Neindorff (1923–2004)	• Kleine Reit- und Fahrlehre 1975 • Dressage Formula 1980 • Die reine Lehre der klassischen Reitkunst 2005 • The Art of Classical Horsemanship 2009	German	
Paul Belasik	• Riding towards the light: an apprenticeship in the art of dressage riding 1990 • Exploring dressage technique: journeys into the art of classical riding 1994 • The essential Paul Belasik 2001 • Dressage for the 21st century 2002 • A search for collection: science and art in riding 2009	English	
Walter Zettl	Dressage in harmony: from basic to Grand Prix 1998 • Dressur in Harmonie: von der Basis bis zum Grand Prix (translation of the above by Simone Engels) 2003 • The Circle of Trust (with Paul Schopf and Jane Seigler) 2008	English	

== 2000 to the present ==
Author	Principal works	Original language	Notes
