= Classical dressage =

Art of riding

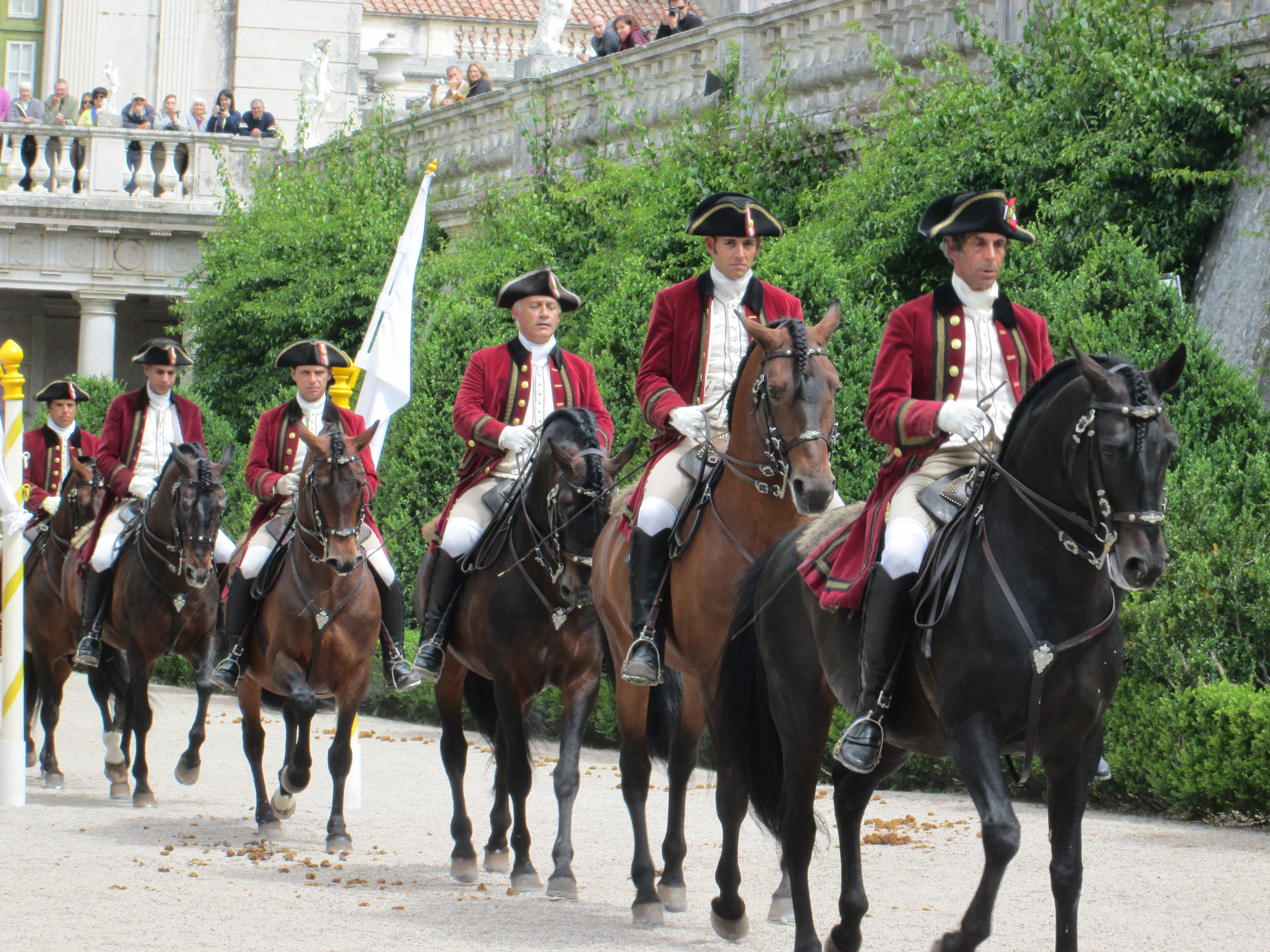
Lusitano riders of the Portuguese School of Equestrian Art, one of the "Big Four" most prestigious riding academies in the world, alongside the Cadre Noir, the Spanish Riding School, and the Royal Andalusian School.

Classical dressage evolved from cavalry movements and training for the battlefield, and has since developed into the competitive dressage seen today. Classical riding is the art of riding in harmony with, rather than against, the horse.

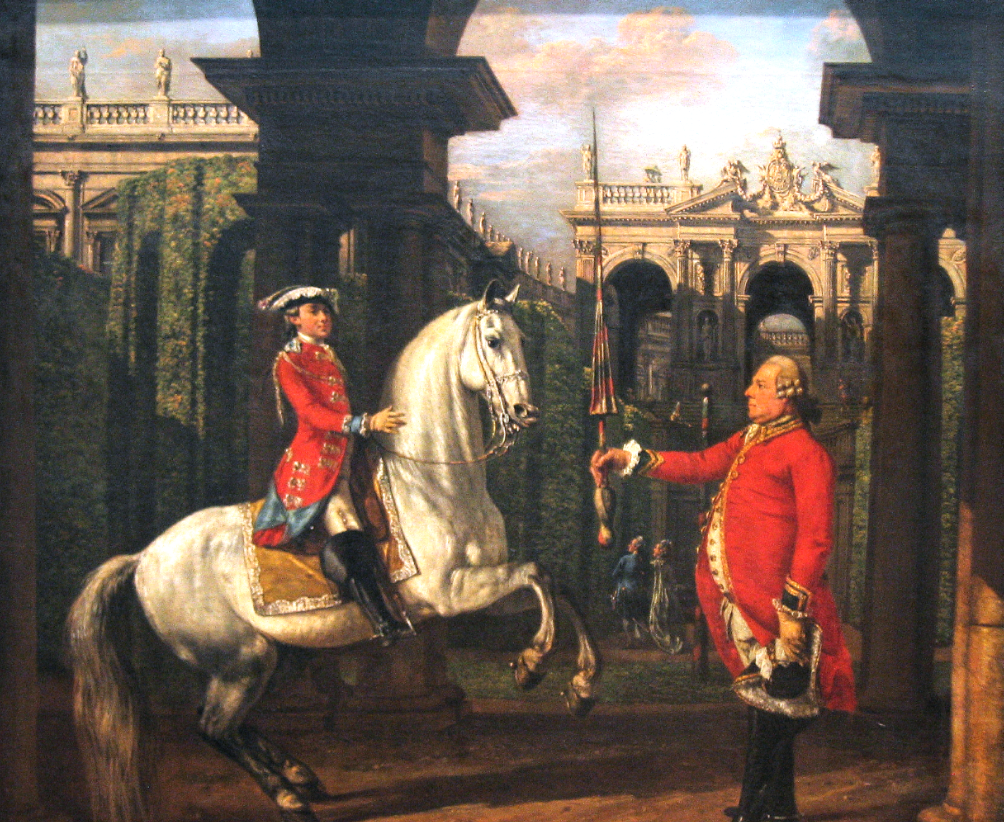
A painting of the Spanish Riding School in 1783

Correct classical riding only occurs when the rider has a good seat and a correct and well-balanced body position, moves with the horse's motion, and applies and times the aids correctly.

== Natural abilities of the horse ==
The origins of classical dressage and collection lie in the natural ability of the horse and its movements in the wild. In fact, most modern definitions of dressage state that the goal is to have the horse perform under saddle with the degree of athleticism and grace that it naturally shows when free.

Horses naturally use collection when playing, fighting, competing and courting with each other. When trying to impress other horses, they make themselves look bigger, just as other animals do. They achieve this by lifting the forehand, raising the neck and making it bigger by flexing the poll, while at the same time transforming their gaits to emphasize more upwards movement. When fighting, the horse will collect because in collection he can produce lightning speed reactions for kicking, rearing, spinning, striking with the front feet, bucking and jumping.

This natural ability to collect is visible in every horse of any breed, and probably inspired early trainers to reproduce that kind of behavior in more controlled circumstances. This origin also points out why, according to most Classical dressage trainers, every healthy horse, regardless of its breed, can perform classical dressage movements, including the Haute Ecole jumps, or Airs above the ground, even though it may perform them a little differently from the ideal performance due to the build of its body.

The ultimate goal of dressage training is to develop a horse to its ability as an athlete: maximum performance with a minimum of effort. The training scale (as set for in the German riding instruction) is to physically develop the horse in a consistent manner with longevity in mind. Dressage is fitness training and needs to be treated as such, with thought, compassion and patience.

== History ==
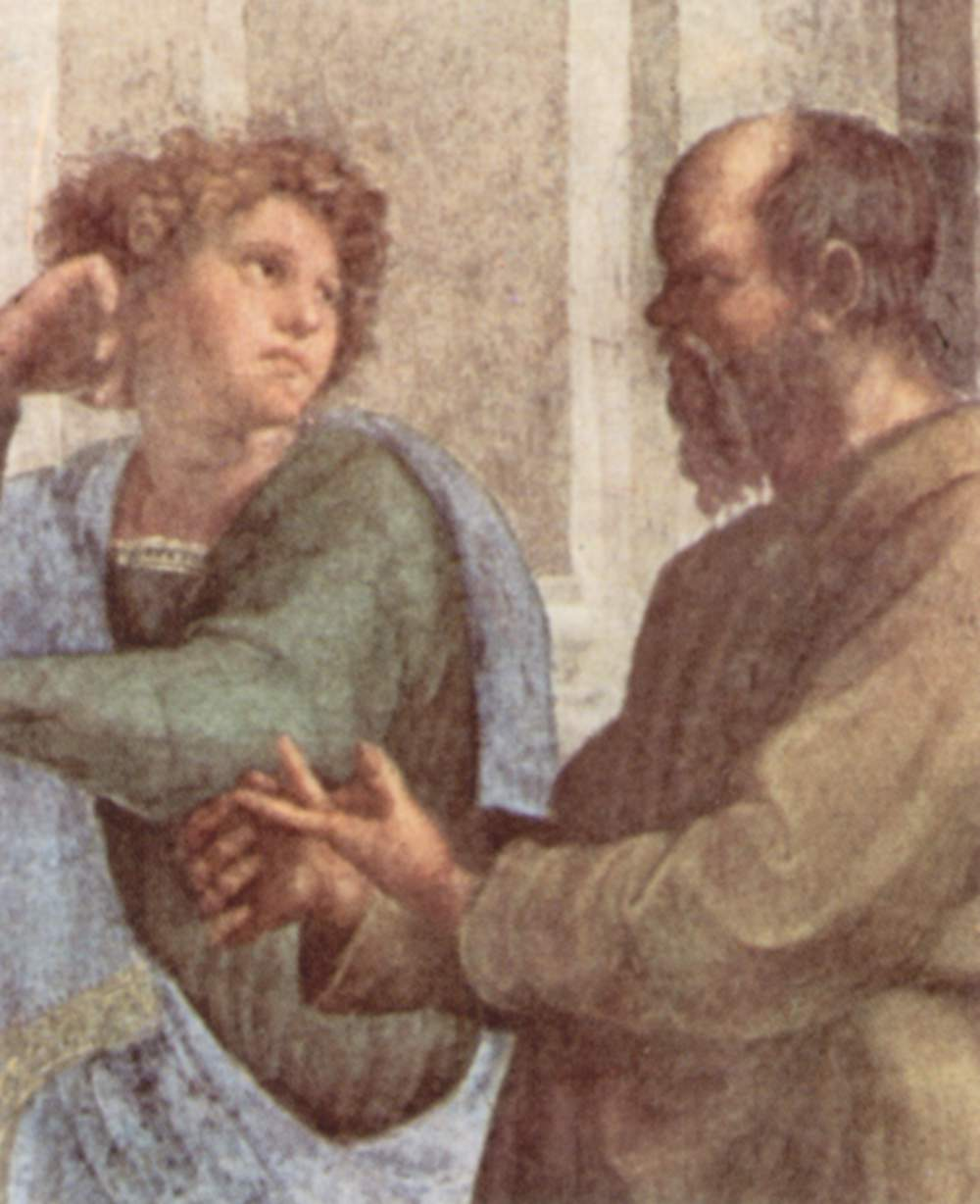
Xenophon and Socrates

The Western World's earliest complete surviving work on many of the principles of classical dressage is Xenophon's On Horsemanship. Xenophon emphasized training the horse through kindness and reward.

In the 15th century, brute force training fell out of favour, while artistry in riding came to the fore. Along with these developments came an increase in indoor riding. The Renaissance gave rise to a new and more enlightened approach to riding, as a part of the general cultivation of the classical arts. By the Victorian age, indoor riding had become a sophisticated art, with both rider and horse spending many years perfecting their form. Gueriniere, Eisenberg, Ruy d'Andrade and Marialva wrote treatises on technique and theory during these periods.

The horses were trained to perform a number of airs above the ground (or "sauts d'école") movements, which could enable their riders to escape if surrounded, or to fight more easily. These included movements such as levade, capriole, courbette, and ballotade. Movements still seen today in competitive dressage include the piaffe, passage, and half-pass.

== Compared to competitive dressage ==
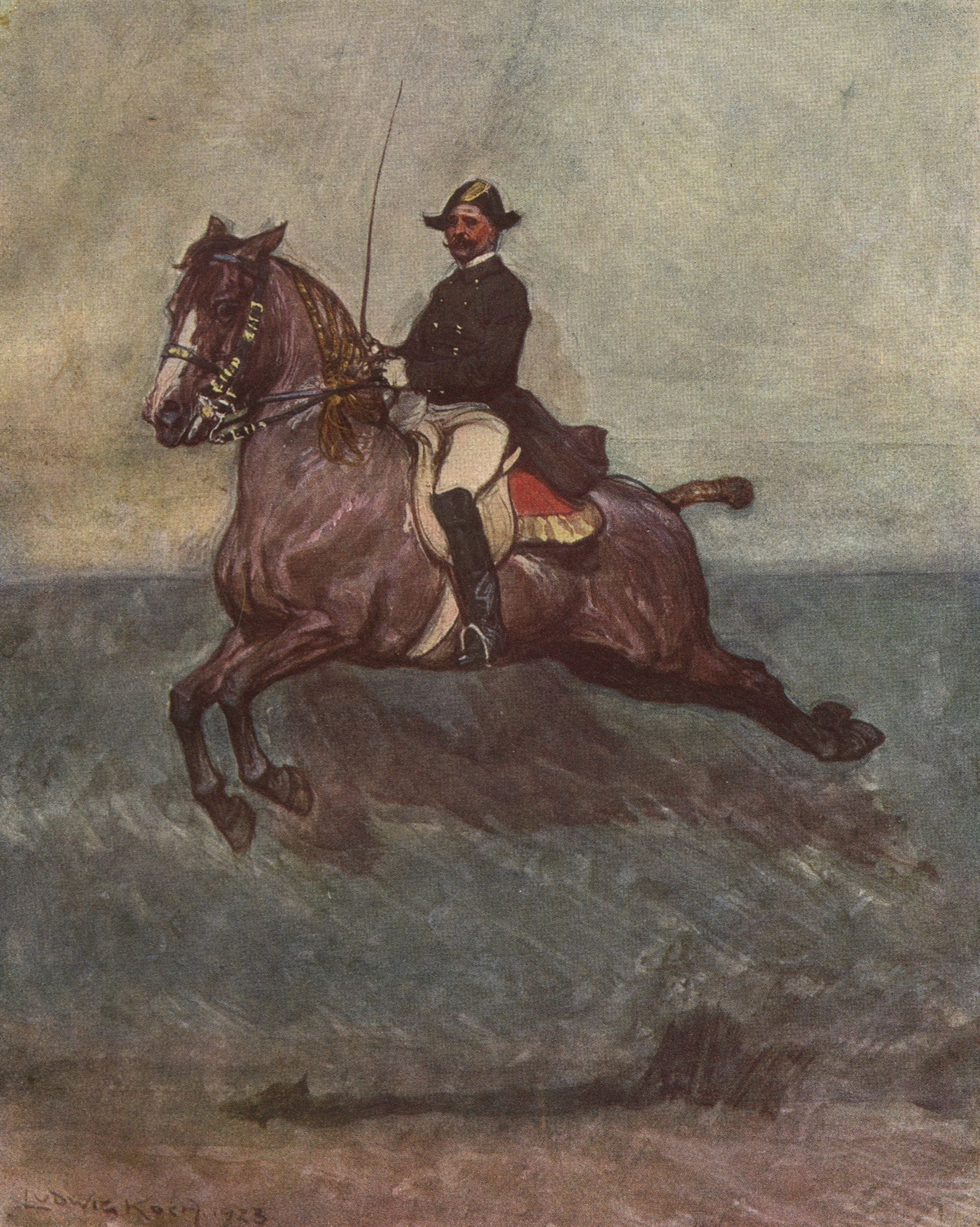
Capriole

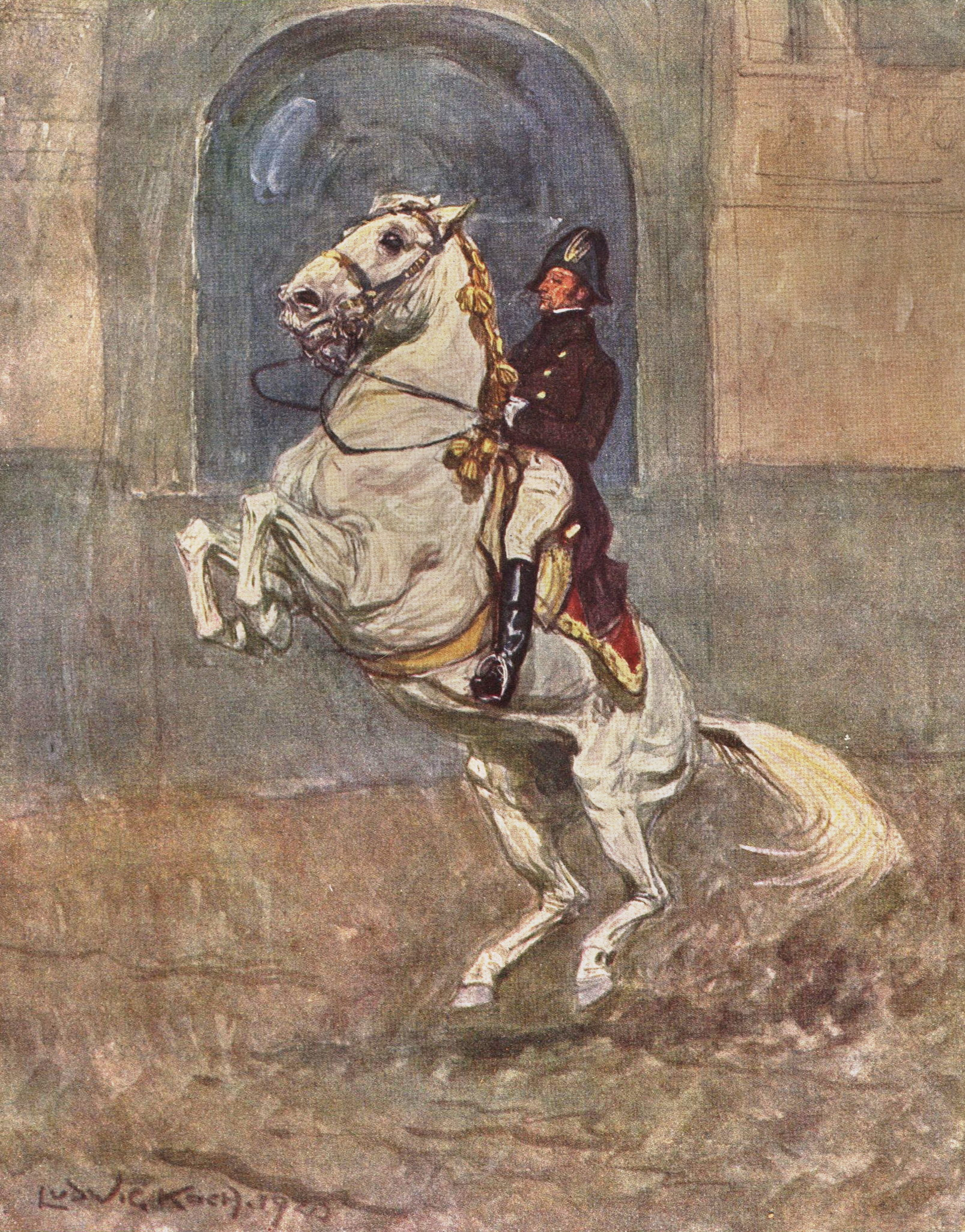
Courbette

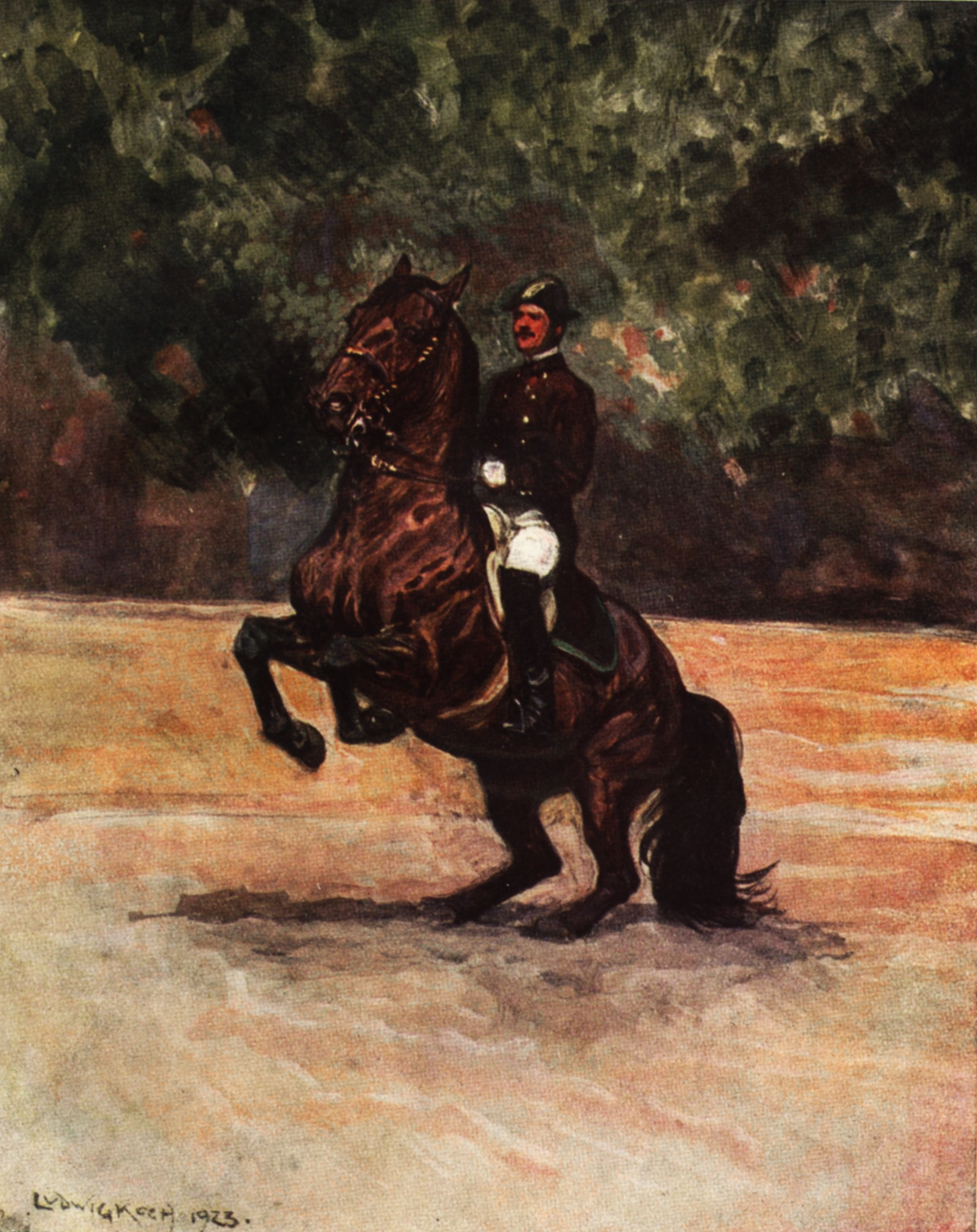
Levade

Modern, or competitive, dressage evolved in the competition arena, although it now exists in a very different form from its ancestor. Competitive dressage is an international sport ranging from beginner levels to the Olympics.

In theory, competitive dressage should follow the same principles as classical dressage. However, there has been criticism by some riders for the trend at all levels for "quick fixes" and incorrect training that makes the horse appear correct, but that is in fact neglecting the fundamentals. Classical riders criticize such training methods on the grounds that they are biomechanically incompatible with correct movement, are painful to the horse, and cause long-term physical damage. These short-cuts usually catch up to the rider as they move up the levels and need to be corrected to perform certain movements. While these modern methods, such as the highly controversial rollkur technique, can produce winning animals, classical dressage riders argue that such training is incorrect and even abusive.

It is also believed by some that competitive dressage does not always reward the most correctly trained horse and rider, especially at the lower levels. For example, some riders who consider themselves to be training classically would not ask their horse to hold his head near-vertical when he first began training, and this would be penalized at the lower levels of competitive dressage, marked down because the horse is not considered to be correctly on the bit. Other riders, who also would consider themselves classically trained, would disagree, saying that if a horse is not ready to travel in a correct outline (on the bit) he is not ready for competition, and this is the reason such horses would be marked down.

The highest form of classical riding, as well as dressage, high school dressage, or haute école, takes years for both the horse and rider to master. When a horse is advanced in its training, it can perform not only Grand Prix dressage movements such as collected and extended gaits, passage and piaffe, but some can also perform certain "Airs Above the Ground," although usually a horse will only be trained in one air, and only if it is particularly able.

== The school jumps ==
The "high school" or haute ecole school jumps, popularly known as the "airs above the ground", include the courbette, capriole, levade, and ballotade. Though these movements are said to come from when the horse was used in war, in their modern form, the airs were unlikely to have been used in actual battle, as all but the capriole expose the horse's sensitive underbelly to the weapons of foot soldiers, and they were more likely training exercises used off the battlefield.

The courbette is a movement where the horse balances on its hind legs and jumps, keeping its fore legs off the ground, thus it "hops" on its hind legs.

The capriole is a movement where the horse leaps into the air and pulls his fore legs in towards his chest at the height of elevation, while kicking out with his hind legs.

The levade' is a movement where the horse is balanced on its haunches at a 45° angle from the ground. It requires great control and balance, and is very strenuous.

Two main breeds are most well known for their abilities for airs above ground: the Lipizzaner and the Andalusian. Other breeds known for their abilities in high school dressage include the Friesian and Lusitano.

The Spanish Riding School in Vienna, as well as the Cadre Noir in Saumur, still practices and teaches the haute ecole. The Spanish Riding School exclusively uses Lipizzaner stallions for their work.

Today, the only remaining large schools of classical dressage are the Cadre Noir, the Spanish Riding School, the Royal Andalusian School of Equestrian Art in Jerez de la Frontera, the Portuguese School of Equestrian Art in Lisbon and the Mexican Haute École of Riders Domecq in Texcoco as well as the German Riding School Egon von Neindorff. Independent classical dressage trainers also endeavor to keep this branch of the art alive, including the Portuguese riding master Nuno Oliveira and his students, Bent Branderup, and the American clinician, Paul Belasik.

== Dressage masters and authors ==
- Xenophon (427-355 BC): Greek general, the earliest European master with surviving treatises, wrote On Horsemanship which advocated the use of sympathetic training of the horse. Despite living over 2000 years ago, his ideas are still widely praised
- Federico Grisone (mid-16th century): one of the few to write on horsemanship to that point since Xenophon. Was considered a master of his time; his methods are viewed as harsh and cruel by modern standards
- Giovanni Battista Pignatelli (mid- to late-16th century)
- Salomon de La Broue (1530–1610)
- Antoine de Pluvinel (1555–1620): the first of the French riding masters, author of L’Instruction du Roy en l’Exercise de Monter a Cheval, tutor to King Louis XIII, and is the first notable writer to advocate for gentle training since Xenophon
- William Cavendish, 1st Duke of Newcastle (1592–1676): Master of Horse to Charles II of England
- François Robichon de La Guérinière (1688–1751): taught the classical position still used today, introduced the flying change, and had great impact on the Spanish Riding School
- Maximilian Weyrother (1783–1833) director of the Spanish Riding School
- François Baucher (1796–1873): introduced the one-tempi flying change, his method, which is still hotly contested, was based on the fact that the horse's jaw is the source of all resistance; there are two 'manners' by which Baucher is known, the first a more dominant form of riding comparable to the modern rollkur, the second more associated with 'lightness' and a lessening of the hands and legs as the horse progresses
- Count Antoine Cartier D'Aure (1799–1863)
- Gustav Steinbrecht (1808–1885)
- James Fillis (1834–1913)
- Alois Podhajsky (1898–1973): became director of the Spanish Riding School in 1939; his books in English translation form the basis of Classical Dressage today
- Nuno Oliveira (1925–1989) quite possibly the greatest horseman of the last century, a master of classical dressage.
- Egon von Neindorff (1923–2004): author of The Art of Classical Horsemanship
