= Paul Belasik =

British horse trainer

Paul Belasik is a horse trainer and clinician in the classical dressage tradition. A student of Nuno Oliveira and H.L.M van Schaik, he is also a graduate of Cornell University and has competed in dressage at the international level. He has written several top selling books on dressage, and his work is strongly influenced by his study of the concepts of Zen Buddhism and martial arts. Early in his career he competed in eventing before focusing exclusively on dressage.

Belasik is critical of the new trends in competitive dressage that deemphasize the importance of collection. To that end, he has participated in studies in equine biomechanics with Dr. Hilary Clayton and demonstrated that horses trained by Belasik in the classical tradition placed a greater load on their hindquarters when performing than did other horses studied who were used in modern competitive dressage. Belasik's view is that there is no need to reinvent the biomechanics of dressage, stating, "Despite recent developments in breeding, horses have not evolved recently in any manner that requires a re-examination of the principles of Gueriniere, Podhajsky, Steinbrecht, et al.”

He gives clinics, lectures, and demonstrations internationally as well as working with students at his Pennsylvania Riding Academy at Lost Hollow Farm. As an instructor, he attempts to blend both practical and physical aspects of riding, but also the artistic, scientific, and philosophical components of horsemanship. Former assistants include Laurie Joliffe and Andrea Velas.

== Works published ==
- Riding towards the light: an apprenticeship in the art of dressage riding London : J.A. Allen (1990)
- Exploring dressage technique: journeys into the art of classical riding London : J.A. Allen (1994)
- The songs of horses: Seven stories for riding teachers and students London : J.A. Allen (1999)
- The Essential Paul Belasik North Pomfret, Vt. : Trafalgar Square Pub. (2001) (compilation volume of Riding Towards the Light, Exploring Dressage Technique, and The Songs of Horses)
- Dressage for the 21st century North Pomfret, Vt. : Trafalgar Square Pub. (2002)
- A search for collection: science and art in riding London : J. A. Allen (2009)
