= Louis Seeger =

German equestrian and author

Louis Seeger (1798–1865) was a German equestrian who published several books and was influential in the development of dressage. Trained under Maximilian Weyrother, his methods were highly influenced by the great François Robichon de la Guérinière. Seeger passed on this knowledge through his riding school in Berlin, the first private school in Germany, where his students included Gustav Steinbrecht.

His book System der Reitkunst ("System of Horsemanship"), published in 1844, received the gold medal. In 1852 he published Herr Baucher und seine Künste - Ein ernstes Wort an Deutschlands Reiter ("Mr. Baucher and His Methods: An Earnest Word to Germany's Rider"), in which he criticized the training techniques of Francois Baucher, after he had watched the French rider and had been given the chance to ride several horses trained by the man.

== Published works ==
- System der Reitkunst Berlin: Herbig 1844 Full text ("System of Horsemanship")
- Züchtung, Erziehung, Ausbildung des Pferdes im systematischen Zusammenhange Berlin: Herbig 1850. Full text ("Breeding, Training, Schooling of the Horse in a Coherent System")
- Herr Baucher und seine Künste - Ein ernstes Wort an Deutschlands Reiter Berlin: Herbig 1852 Full text ("Mr. Baucher and His Methods: An Earnest Word to Germany's Rider")
