= Klaus Ferdinand Hempfling =

Klaus Ferdinand Hempfling (born 1957) is a specialist in communication and human movement best known for his unorthodox approach to training and working with horses. Hempfling first rose to prominence when he released the book Dancing with Horses in the early 1990s. In it he advocated horsemanship based on precise communication with the horse through body language rather than through more coercive methods.

He currently lives and operates in Denmark.

== Early life ==
Hempfling was born in Westphalia in Germany in 1957. He has stated that he spent much of his childhood living alone "in the woods", apparently estranged from his family.

As a young adult, Hempfling completed studies in telecommunications technology in 1978. He then spent time variously as a teacher, freelance artist and theatrical director. He travelled extensively, and spent several years in Spain. While Eastern philosophies were fashionable in Europe at the time and drew many travellers to regions such as India, Hempfling was drawn more to the traditions of ancient and medieval Europe. Hempfling has occasionally referred to these old European traditions, particularly the concept of the knight as one who acts in harmony with, and achieves "complete being" or "oneness" with, their horse.

At age 26 Hempfling became a lecturer at the School of Art and Design in Dortmund. While at this stage he had not yet had any direct contact with horses, Hempfling became captivated by the prominent role of the horse in mythology. At age 29 he decided to seek out contact with real horses.

To better understand horses Hempfling went through an intense period of "study, experimentation, learning and feeling" and began to develop his own training methods. He returned to Spain to observe feral horses in the Pyrenees Mountains and to study, if not employ, traditional training methods. His effectiveness as a horseman was noted by others and he soon began giving his own clinics and lessons. Within two years of his first contact with horses, Hempfling wrote Mit Pferden tanzen ("Dancing with Horses"), which described his approach to horse training and communication. Written in his native German, Dancing with Horses has been translated into several languages, including English, and became an international bestseller.

== Approach ==
Most traditional and modern horse training methods utilise forms of operant conditioning, particularly negative reinforcement or "pressure/release" methods. While acknowledging their apparent effectiveness, Hempfling has explicitly rejected many conventional methods of horse training. He has distanced himself from the term "horse whisperer" which he associates with these techniques.

Instead, Hempfling promotes the use of specific body language to establish a relationship between horse and human in which the horse recognises the human handler as the higher-ranking, dominant partner, but in which there is still trust in the handler. Hempfling claims that the handler can establish this relationship of dominance and trust through the use of subtle but powerful body signals and without the need for significant psychological or physical pressure on the horse. Hempfling developed these signals through his observations of high-ranking animals in feral horse populations.

Hempfling incorporates this body language into all aspects of horse handling and training, including leading, lunging and riding. The handler's self-awareness, authenticity and mental and physical self-control are critical to the effectiveness of these techniques. Hempfling emphasises that seemingly trivial details, such as the handler's body posture, proximity to the horse or their minor haste or hesitation in acting or responding, can significantly affect the horse's response and its acceptance of the handler's rank.

Hempfling also incorporates some elements of classical horsemanship in his training and his earlier books frequently mention classical principles. Overall, however, many of his techniques appear to bear little resemblance to conventional methods.

The purported benefits of Hempfling's approach are that, once an effective relationship is established and maintained, the horse will be genuinely drawn to the handler, and the process of learning and training will become easier and more harmonious as the horse becomes a more willing and psychologically content partner. Horses can eventually be trained to ride with extremely subtle aids in this manner.

Hempfling has been demonstrating these techniques for most of his career, often working with difficult, fearful or apparently aggressive horses and appearing to transform their behaviour within minutes. Many of these encounters have been filmed and included in movie documentaries and on YouTube. Hempfling has written several books in German documenting his evolving methods and outlook on horses, people and life. Several of these works have been translated into English.

=== Character types ===
Hempfling has emphasised the importance of tailoring training approaches to different horses according to their unique characteristics. He has claimed that a horse's temperament, intelligence, behaviour and potential health prospects can be partly predicted through its physical appearance, such as its facial structure and proportions and its conformation. His book What Horses Reveal categorises horses into 26 main character types, describing the physical characteristics that can be used to identify each character type, how this affects the horse's observable behaviour and personality traits, and how a person should best interact with and train the horse according to its type.

== Current activity ==
Hempfling conducts horse-related clinics and seminars at his Akedah International school in Denmark, where he lives with his family. He also provides personal development and other consulting services through the school.

== Works available in English ==
=== Books ===
- Dancing with Horses (2001)
- What Horses Reveal (2004)
- It's Not I Who Seek the Horse: The Horse Seeks Me (2010)
- The Message from the Horse (2015)
- Der Ruf der Nomaden (2024)

=== Film documentaries ===
- Dancing with Horses (2000)
- Coming Together (2005)
- Horse Land (2016)
