= Walter Zettl =

German dressage rider and horse trainer

Walter A. Zettl (1929 - June 7, 2018) was a German dressage rider and Olympic-level dressage horse trainer. He was born in 1929 in Alt-Rohlau, Bohemia, which is now Stará Role in the Karlovy Vary region of the Czech Republic.

== Career ==
Zettl began his riding career in 1945, as a student of Herbert Aust. In 1950, at the age of 21, Zettl became the youngest person ever to be awarded the German Federation Gold Riding Medal, for success in upper level dressage and jumping for a single competitive season. In 1952, he was selected to compete for Germany's dressage team in the Helsinki Summer Olympics, but was ruled to be a professional rider and therefore ineligible. In 1953 Walter Zettl was chosen to succeed Otto Loerke and Willi Schultheis as trainer at Gestuet Vornholz.

In 1955, he earned his formal Reitlehrer certification as a riding coach and began training young champions while continuing to compete himself. He won several awards in the Bavarian Dressage Championships and the Salzburg International Jumping Grand Prix on a horse he rode for the first time.

In 1981, he moved to Canada, where he served as Managing Director of the Canadian I.E.S.S. owned by Hans and Eva Maria Pracht. During his years in Canada, he coached the young rider's dressage team from Ontario which subsequently went on to win three consecutive team gold medals, one individual gold medal, two individual silver medals, and one individual bronze medal at the North American Continental Young Riders Championships. In 1984 at the Los Angeles Summer Olympics he served as the dressage coach to the 3-day event Canadian team. Walter Zettl has been a Canadian citizen since 1987.

In 2011, he was inducted into the Toronto CADORA Dressage Association Hall of Fame.

From 2002-2005, he starred in a five-volume video series called A Matter of Trust. The first volume debuted in 2002, and Volume V was released in 2005. The series covers classical dressage techniques from Training level to Grand Prix and teaches how to create a harmonious partnership between horse and rider. In 2017, the USDF archived the instructional video series A Matter of Trust, as well as the book Ask Walter, preserving for future generations of equestrian sports to benefit from, thanks to the United States Dressage Federation (USDF), Mark Neihart and Heidi Zorn of Dancing Deer, LLC., producers of the Matter of Trust Series, with Walter Zettl.

== Riding theories ==
Zettl's equestrian education took place in Germany during a period when the art, cavalry, and the modern sport of dressage came together. As such, he was exposed to the theory of Gustav Steinbrecht and its implementation in the 1912, 1926 and 1937 German Reitvorschrift (Rule Book) by Redwitz, Heydebreck and Burkner. Zettl's teaching and writing have been greatly influenced by the Germanic approach to dressage training which is evident in his classic publication "Dressage in Harmony: From Basic to Grand Prix". In this book, he lays out the theory and practice of dressage in a technical yet compassionate way. While other books in the field concentrate on theoretical or technical only discussions, his book is comprehensive in the sense of clearly describing the notions of what needs to be done, why it should be done, and most importantly how it is to be done. His description of the exercises clearly demonstrates the importance of the relationships among the elements of the training scale. The inclusion of the Entwickeln work in the Shoulder-In, Renvers and Travers is the only source available in the English academic equitation literature. These techniques were handed down to Zettl from Colonel Aust, who himself built upon the legacy of Julius Walzer who served as the trainer of the gold medal-winning German Olympic Dressage Team in the 1928 Games of the IXth Olympiad in Amsterdam.

It is also evident, in his writing and teaching, that his approach to dressage training is based on a deep psychological understanding of the equine partner. Zettl makes the notion of a harmonious relationship between horse and rider to be the central thesis of his riding theory. He rules out any approach that uses forceful methods and keeps reminding his readers that the only way to successful riding lies in a relationship that is built upon trust between horse and rider.

== Quotes ==
"The goal of all dressage riding should be to bring the horse and rider together in harmony...a oneness of balance, purpose, and athletic expression."

"Trust and respect are two-way streets. We want the horse to accept us as leaders of the herd, to guide them safely and to provide protection and comfort. In return, they will give us their respect, and willing submission to our ideas about what to do next, and when and where. But this respect can only be based on well deserved trust."

"At each stage of work the horse must be taken to his limit, but never over."

"When you have had a good ride one day, it is wonderful, but it is also very dangerous."

== Published works ==
- Dressage in harmony: from basic to Grand Prix Boonsboro, MD: Half Halt Press 1998 xix, 246pp. ISBN 978-0-939481-54-5
- Dressur in Harmonie: von der Basis bis zum Grand Prix (translated from English by Simone Engels) Warendorf: FN-Verlag der Deutschen Reiterlichen Vereinigung 2003 232pp. ISBN 978-3-88542-381-2
- The Circle of Trust (with Paul Schopf and Jane Seigler) Boonsboro MD: Half Halt Press 2008 175pp. ISBN 978-0-939481-77-4
- Ask Walter Sandy, UT: Dancing Deer LLC. 2013 176pp. ISBN 978-0-9860315-0-2

== Bibliography ==
- Zettl, Walter (1998). Dressage in Harmony: From Basic to Grand Prix. Boonsboro MD: Half Halt Press. p. 246 pages. ISBN 0-939481-54-5.
