= Wilhelm Müseler =

Wilhelm Müseler (1887 in Berlin – 1952 in Göttingen) was an equestrian and author. He wrote an important treatise on horse riding, Reitlehre (1933), and many works on the history of art.

== Published works ==
=== Riding ===
- Reitlehre Berlin: Parey 1933 (2nd edition)
- Riding Logic (translation of Reitlehre by F. W. Schiller) London: Methuen 1937

=== History of art ===
- Deutsche Kunst im Wandel der Zeiten Berlin: Gutenberg [1935]
- Geist und Antlitz der romanischen Zeit Berlin: Boldt 1936
- Geist und Antlitz der Gotik Berlin: Safari-Verlag 1936
- Geist und Antlitz der Renaissance Berlin: Safari-Verlag 1937
- Geist und Antlitz des Barock Berlin: Safari-Verlag 1937
- Europäische Kunst Berlin: Safari-Verlag [1939]
- Europäische Malerei Berlin: Safari-Verlag 1948
- Kunst der Welt: Die alten Kulturen (with Felix Dargel) Berlin: Safari-Verlag 1952 (posthumous)
- Wandlungen in der deutschen Dichtung: Ein Weg zum Überblick (with Irma von Hugo) Göttingen: Musterschmidt-Verlag 1956 (posthumous)

== See also ==
- List of writers on horsemanship
