= James Fillis =

British-born French riding master (1834–1913)

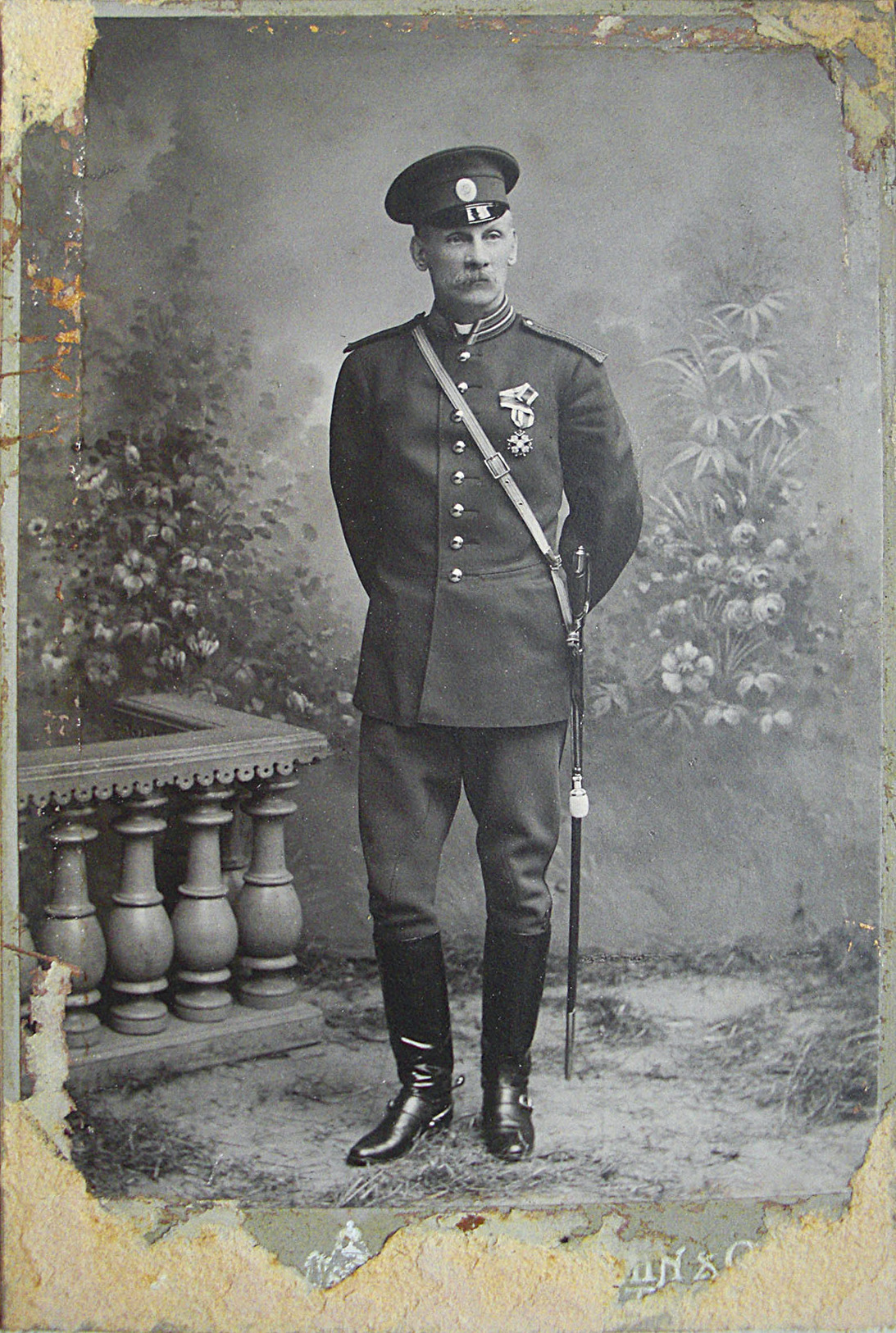
- In Saint Petersburg in about 1902
- Born: James Fillis; 17 December 1834; London
- Died: 3 May 1913; Paris
- Spouses: Adelaide Lambert (married 1869, died 1889); Thérèse Gautier (married 1889)
- Military career
- Branch: Russian Imperial Army (1898–1909)
- Rank: Colonel
- Awards: Order of St. Stanislaus (3rd class); Order of St. Anne (1st class)

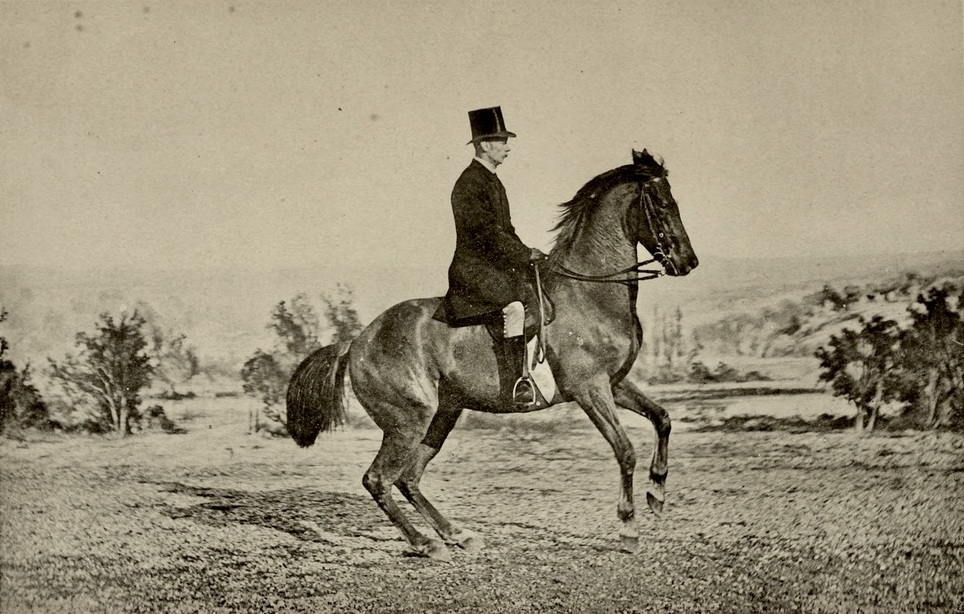
On Germinal at the backwards canter

James Fillis (17 December 1834 – 3 May 1913) was a British-born French horseman and riding master. He had a profound influence on the development of the haute école of dressage in both France and Russia. He travelled widely in Europe, and lived for about twelve years in Russia. He believed he had ridden over a hundred and fifty thousand horses in his lifetime.

== Life ==
Fillis was born in London on 17 December 1834, into family of circus performers and horse trainers. His father Thomas Fillis died in 1842, and the young Fillis went to live in Paris. There are indications that he found work in the circus of Louis Soullier, and it may have been there that he met the noted riding-master François Baucher; he was never a pupil of Baucher, but between 1847 and 1850 followed him on various journeys to Austria, the Italian peninsula and Switzerland. He left the circus for a time, and found employment as a piqueur-chef in the stables of Richard Wallace in Paris. From 1851 he worked as an écuyer or horse-trainer for Victor Franconi, the director of the Cirque des Champs-Élysées

In about 1855 he began to study under François Caron, a former écuyer en chef to the Russian cavalry. From 1859 he was active as a trainer and instructor in his own right.

In 1889 there was a suggestion that he might become écuyer en chef to the Cadre Noir of the École Nationale d'Équitation at Saumur, in Maine-et-Loire in western France; this did not happen, as he was not a soldier.

In the autumn of 1897 Fillis travelled to Saint Petersburg to perform at the Circus Ciniselli; he took four horses, three Thoroughbreds and Maestoso, a Lipizzaner he had bought in Vienna in 1894. His work with them was much admired, and early in 1898 he received an invitation to court, where the Grand Duke Nicholas Nikolaevich, who was at the time inspector-general of the cavalry, asked him to organise a course of instruction for the officers of the Imperial house. The results he obtained in thirty training sessions were such that he was offered the position of écuyer en chef of the training school for cavalry officers, with the military rank of colonel. He was also put in charge of the stables of the Grand Duke. He retired in 1909, and in 1910 returned to France, where he went to live at Saint-Germain-en-Laye. He died in Paris on 3 May 1913.

In 2019 a statue of him was raised in the Manezh of Moscow.

== Theory and teaching ==
In his preface to Breaking and Riding (1890), Fillis states his fundamental principle as:

it is necessary for a horse to be correctly balanced and light in forward movements and propulsion, in order that the rider may obtain the most powerful effects with the least exertion.

His motto was "en avant" ('forward'). His method of equitation consisted, in his own words, of:

distribution of weight by the height of the neck bent at the poll and not at the withers; propulsion by means of the hocks being brought under the body; and lightness by loosening of the lower jaw.

He is also credited with a particular style of holding the reins of a double bridle, with the snaffle rein passing over the index finger and the curb rein under the little finger; however, he himself referred to this as the "French" way in his book Breaking and Riding.

== Published works ==
- Principes de dressage et d'équitation. Paris: C. Marpon et E. Flammarion, 1890. vi, 376 pages; second edition, 1891; translated as:
  - James Fillis, Max von der Zansen-Osten (translator), Grundsätze der Dressur und ueber die Reitkunst. Berlin: Union-Druckerei Borgmann, 1894. xvii, 439 pages, 35 plates; second edition, 1896.
  - James Fillis, Arturo Ballenilla y Espinal (translator), Principios de doma y de equitación. Madrid: Asilo de la Santísima Trinidad, 1901.
  - James Fillis, M. Horace Hayes (translator), Breaking and Riding. London: Hurst and Blackett, 1902.
- Journal de dressage. Paris: E. Flammarion, 1903. xxviii, 405 pages, 28 plates.
- Règlement pour le dressage du cheval d'armes, établi en 1908 par la Commission de l'Ecole d'application de cavalerie des officiers à Saint-Pétersbourg. Traduction de James Fillis, .... Paris: E. Flammarion, [n.d.]. viii, 156 pages.
