= Nuno Oliveira =

Nuno Oliveira (23 June 1925 – 2 February 1989) was a Portuguese equestrian, horse trainer and dressage instructor. His teachings have inspired riders and trainers all over the world to adopt the 'baroque' or 'classical' style of working with the horse; an art which goes back hundreds of years and encompasses the fundamentals which most 'modern' disciplines can be traced back to.

Nuno was born in Lisbon on 23 June 1925. He studied riding under Joaquim Goncalves de Miranda, in the style of the riding academy of Versailles. A great teacher, he possessed a near-encyclopedic knowledge of equestrian theory that crossed many styles and countries. His principal influences were François Robichon de La Guérinière, Gustav Steinbrecht and François Baucher.

Oliveira was offered, but declined, the post of director of the Escola Portuguesa de Arte Equestre.

On 2 February 1989 he was discovered dead in his bed in a hotel in Perth, Western Australia. He enjoyed opera music when riding especially Verdi.

== Published works ==
The published works of Nuno Oliveira include, but probably are not limited to, the following:

- Pequeno álbum de alta escola: 43 fotografias de cavalos ensinados e montados por Nuno Oliveira Póvoa de Santo Adrião, Portugal [1963?] 47pp.
- Haute ećole: forty-three photographs of horses taught and mounted by Nuno Oliviera London: J.A. Allen 1965
- Réflexions sur l'art équestre. Traduit du portugais par René Bacharach Paris: Crépin-Leblond [1965] 95pp.
- Reflections on equestrian art (translated [from the French] by Phyllis Field) London: J. A. Allen 1976 106pp.
- Souvenirs d'un écuyer portugais (adapted by Jeanne Boisseau) Paris: Crépin-Leblond 1982 78pp.
- Classical principles of the art of training horses (illustrated by Fernando Abreu) Caramut, Victoria: Howley and Russell 1983 87pp. 8pl.
- Amalgama: recordações, pensamentos, ensaios Lisboa: Livraria Ferin, [1984] 71pp.
- Elucubrações [S.l.: s.n. 1984] (Mafra: ELO) 51pp.
- Classical principles of the art of training horses, volume 2: From an old master trainer to young trainers Caramut: Howley and Russell 1986 79pp.
- Les Chevaux et leurs cavaliers Paris: Crépin-Leblond 1987 107pp.
- Horses and their riders (with Joy Howley) [Caramut]: Howley and Russell 1988
- Propos sur des croquis équestres Paris: Belin 1990 "Horse and rider: annotated sketches"
- L'art équestre Paris: Ed. Crépin-Leblond 1991 536pp.
- Reflexiones sobre el arte ecuestre (Spanish translation by Juan Antonio Hereza) Madrid: Noticias 1993 199pp.
- Principes classiques de l'art de dresser les chevaux Michel Henriquet [Strasbourg]: Edito 1995 159pp.
- Notes sur l'enseignement de Nuno Oliveira (Jeanne Boisseau, ed.) [Strasbourg]: Edito 1996 143pp.
- Jeunes chevaux, jeunes cavaliers [Strasbourg]: Edito 1996 111pp.
- Propos d'un vieil écuyer aux jeunes écuyers [Strasbourg]: Edito 1996 127pp.
- Sämtliche Schriften, Bd. 1: Klassische Grundsätze der Kunst, Pferde auszubilden (Bertold Schirg, trans.) Hildesheim Zürich New York: Olms-Presse 1996 "Collected works"
- Sämtliche Schriften, Bd. 2: Junge Pferde, junge Reiter (Bertold Schirg, trans.) Hildesheim Zürich New York Olms-Presse 1997 99pp.
- Sämtliche Schriften, Bd. 3: Notizen zum Unterricht (Jeanne Boisseau, ed.; Bertold Schirg, trans.) Hildesheim Zürich New York Olms-Presse 1998 140pp.
- Sämtliche Schriften, Bd. 4: Gedanken über die Reitkunst (Bertold Schirg, trans. [from French]) Hildesheim Zürich New York Olms-Presse 1999 217pp.
- Sämtliche Schriften, Bd. 5: Ratschläge eines alten Reiters an junge Reiter (Bertold Schirg, trans.) Hildesheim Zürich New York Olms-Presse 1999 130pp.
- Oeuvres complètes Paris: Belin 2006 285pp.
