= Rollkur =

Illegal practice in equestrianism

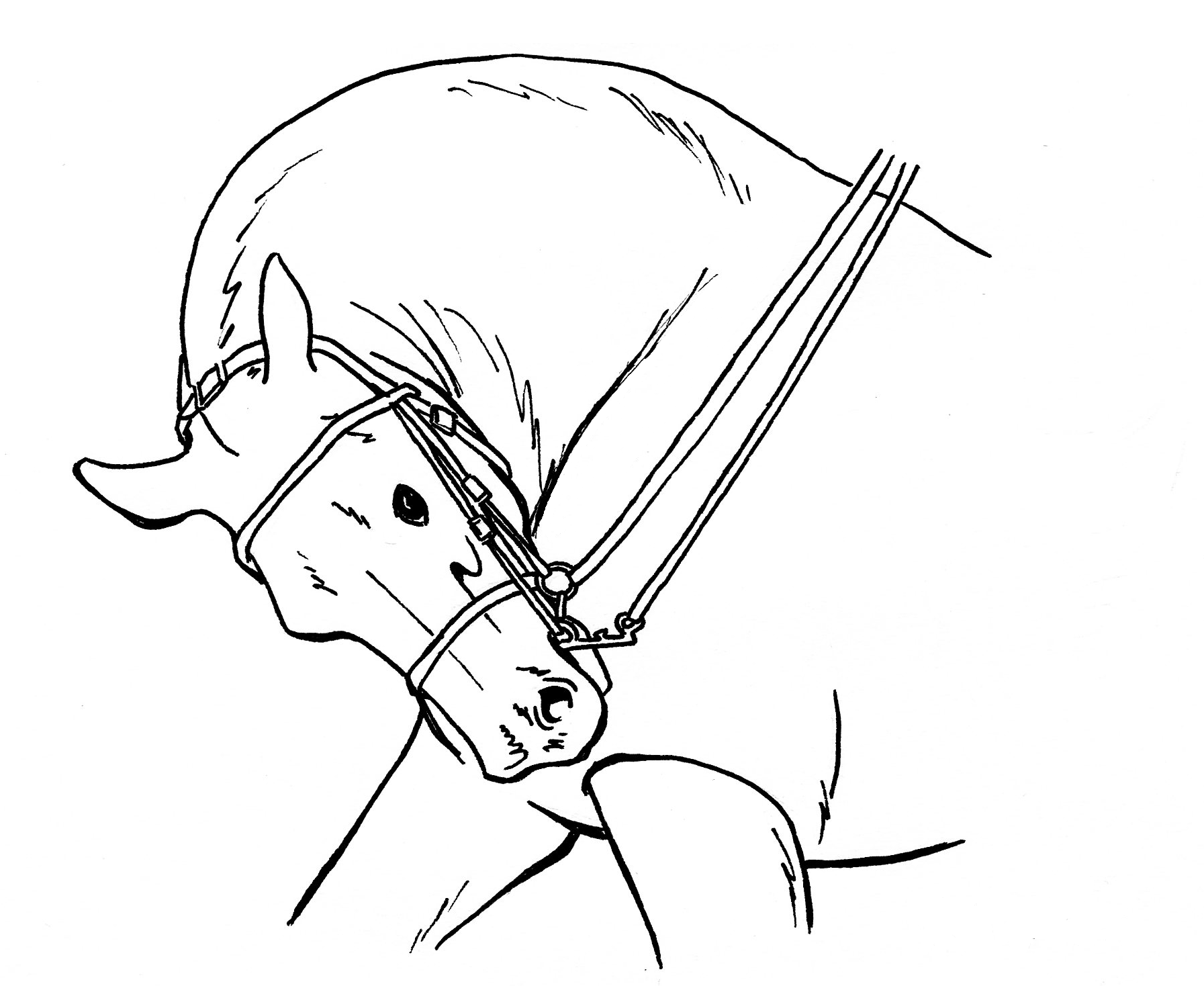
Artist's rendition of a horse undergoing exercise under heavy hyperflexion.

Rollkur or hyperflexion of the horse's neck is defined as "flexion of the horse's neck achieved through aggressive force" and is banned in International and Olympic sanctioned equestrian sports by the governing body, the International Federation for Equestrian Sports (FEI). The FEI recognises a distinction between rollkur and the riding of the horse in a deep outline not achieved by force.

Rollkur has been used by dressage and show jumping riders. The technique has been controversial for some time; petitions and boycotts (including a threatened boycott of the London 2012 Olympics) have been created to ban the practice. The FEI moved to ban the practice following the release of video of Swedish dressage rider Patrik Kittel using rollkur during a competition warm-up, where the horse's tongue appeared to turn blue as a result of the manoeuvre.

== Usage ==
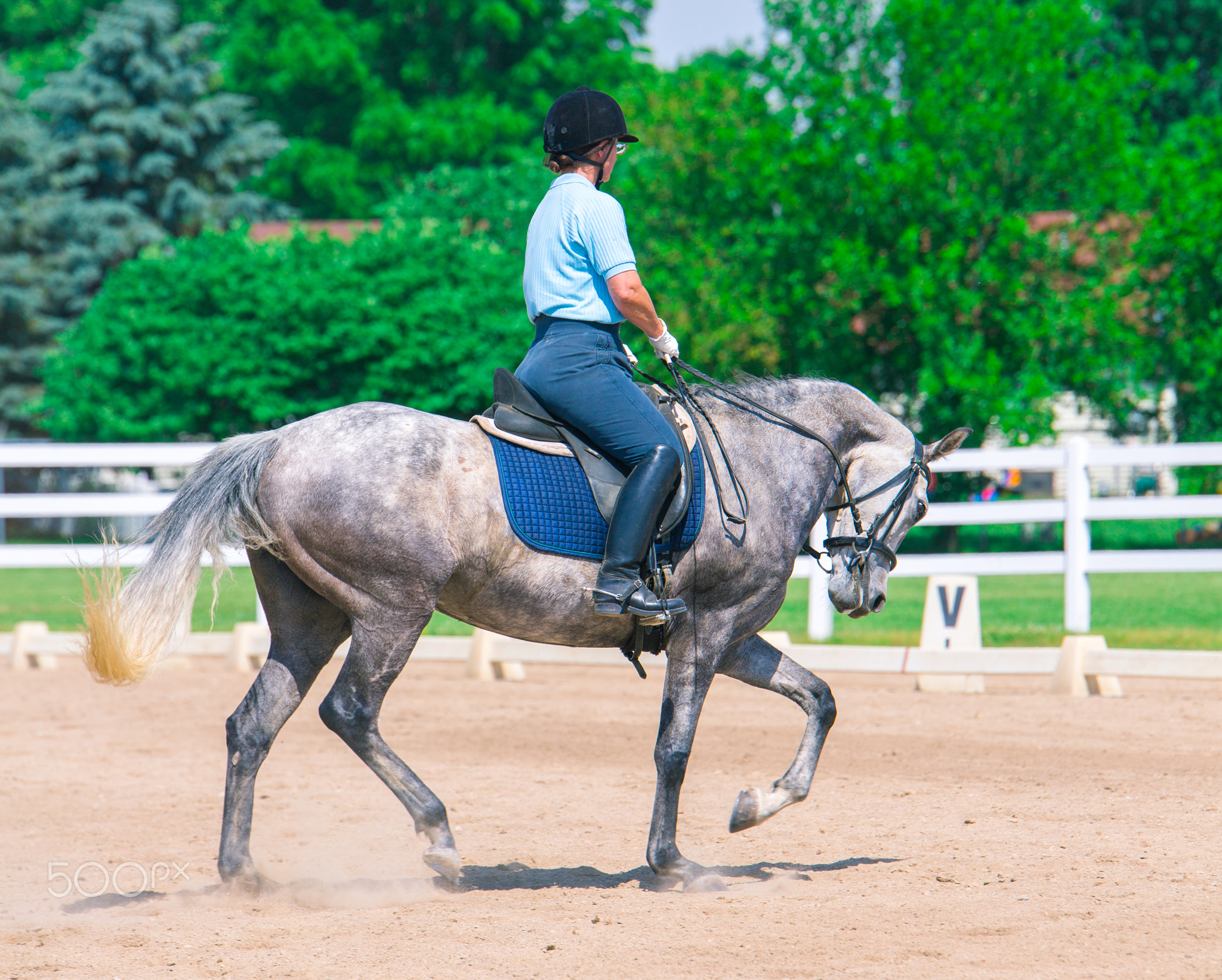
Horse training in rollkur

Rollkur is most often used in dressage training, popularized by Nicole Uphoff and Isabell Werth in the 1990's. In 2008 at the FEI Dressage World Cup, the 15 highest-scoring equine competitors spent the majority of performance time in hyperflexion in all primary gaits. In 2014 a study found out of 355 horses in a competition environment, 69% were behind the vertical, an umbrella term referring to all hyperflexion - including the most severe instance, rollkur.

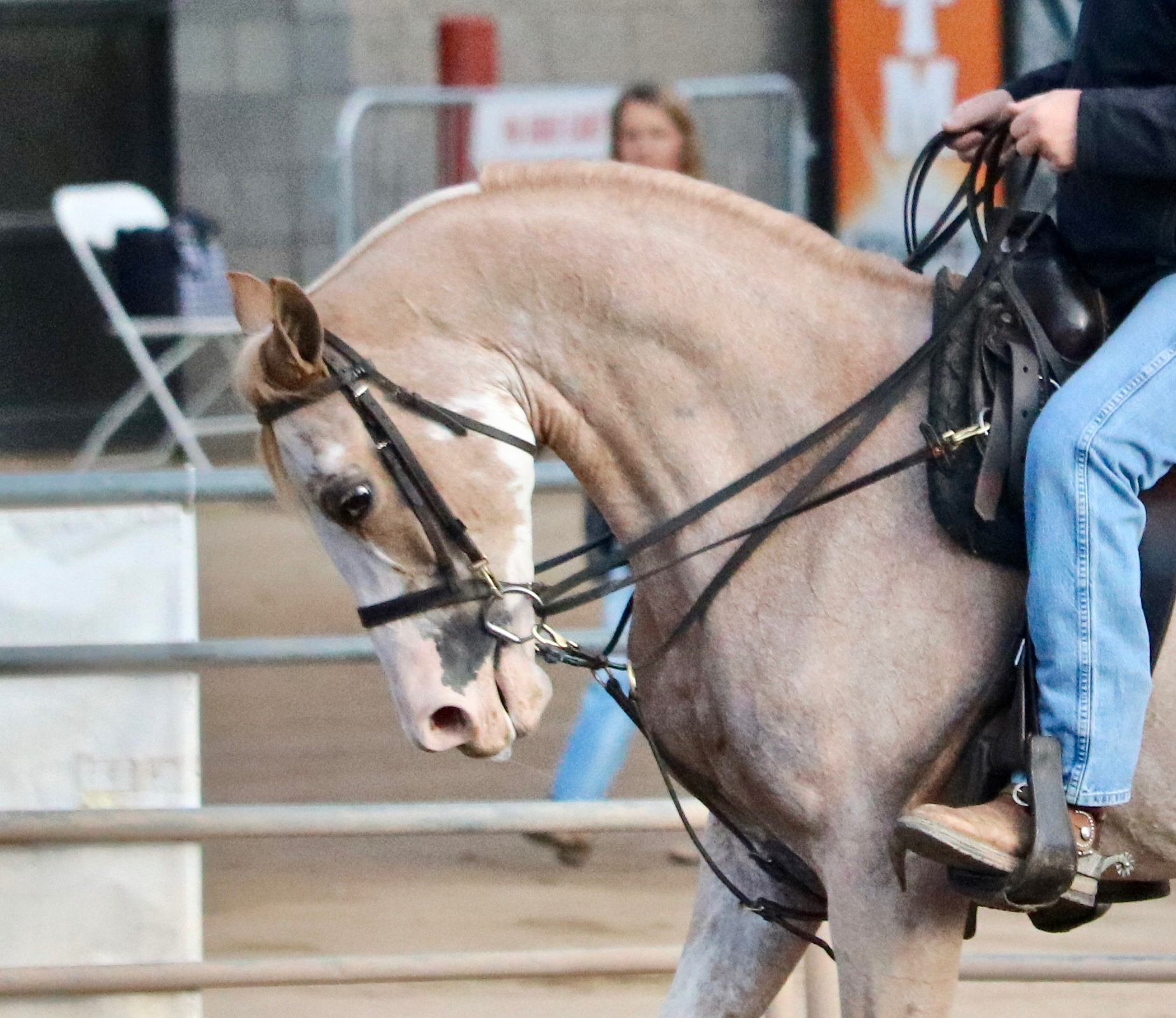
Rollkur in use during western riding

Intentional hyperflexion is traceable back to François Baucher. Baucher, however, asked for hyperflexion while placing emphasis on maintaining forwardness and impulsion, using a technique referred to as 'ramener outre'. Hyperflexion has also been observed being used in other disciplines such as reining and show jumping.

== Rationale ==
Proponents point to leading riders and trainers who apply this technique and have consistent winning scores in the arena. Studies have supported this, with results indicating that horses in hyperflexion were awarded higher scores by judges in competition. The scoring advantage is attributed to greater exaggeration of the horses' leg and back movements, which thereby appear more expressive, as well as more extreme forward protraction of the front legs. Those who train horses using rollkur (colloquially referred to as low, deep, and round) have claimed the practice can increase control of the horse, relax a tense horse, and provide a deep stretch through the neck and over the back.

== Health and welfare ==
Hyperflexion of the neck has been linked to airway obstruction, musculoskeletal pathology, stress, fear, and pain in horses.

Horses ridden in hyperflexion show more conflict behaviors (resistance to the rider's commands) and signs of discomfort, even at the highest level of competition, indicating that the posture is aversive even after prolonged training and experience.

Rollkur also impacts forward vision, as horses have a relatively limited vertical field of vision and cannot see in front of them with their noses pointing vertically downwards or backwards. This may itself lead to further stress while in hyperflexion, as the horse cannot adequately watch out for obstacles while moving forward.

== Arguments for banning ==
Despite the official FEI rules of dressage, which state that "the head should remain in a steady position, as a rule slightly in front of the vertical, with a supple poll as the highest point of the neck", horses in FEI competition routinely work with their heads behind the vertical, in hyperflexion. Judges have been found to penalize competitors for heavy use of behind the vertical posture at lower levels of competition, but not at the higher levels of competition.

Debates remain as to whether rollkur constitutes animal abuse, both physically, due to the held over-flexed position and mentally due to forced submission, however the practice remains commonplace in dressage competition.
