= Ludwig Hünersdorf =

German equestrian

Ludwig Hünersdorf (1748–1812) was a German equestrian.
