= Maximilian Weyrother =

Austrian horse trainer

Maximilian Weyroter
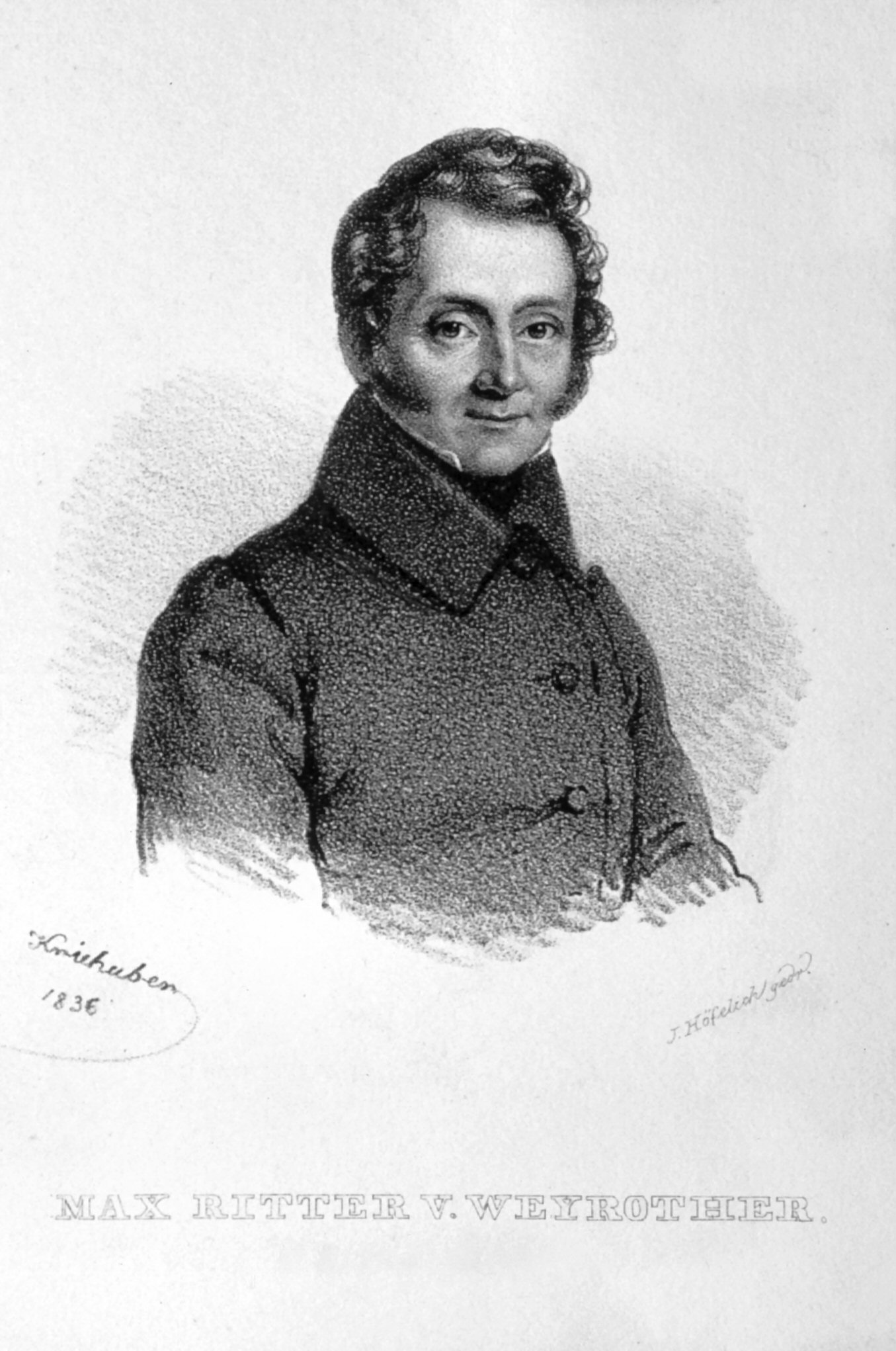
- Maximilian Weyrother, lithograph, 1836
- Born: 1783
- Died: 28 November 1833 (approximately age 60); Vienna, Austria
- Occupation: Horse trainer
- Known for: Chief Rider, Spanish Riding School

Max Ritter von Weyrother (1783–1833) was Chief Rider of the Spanish Riding School in Vienna from 1813, and Director from 1814 to 1833.

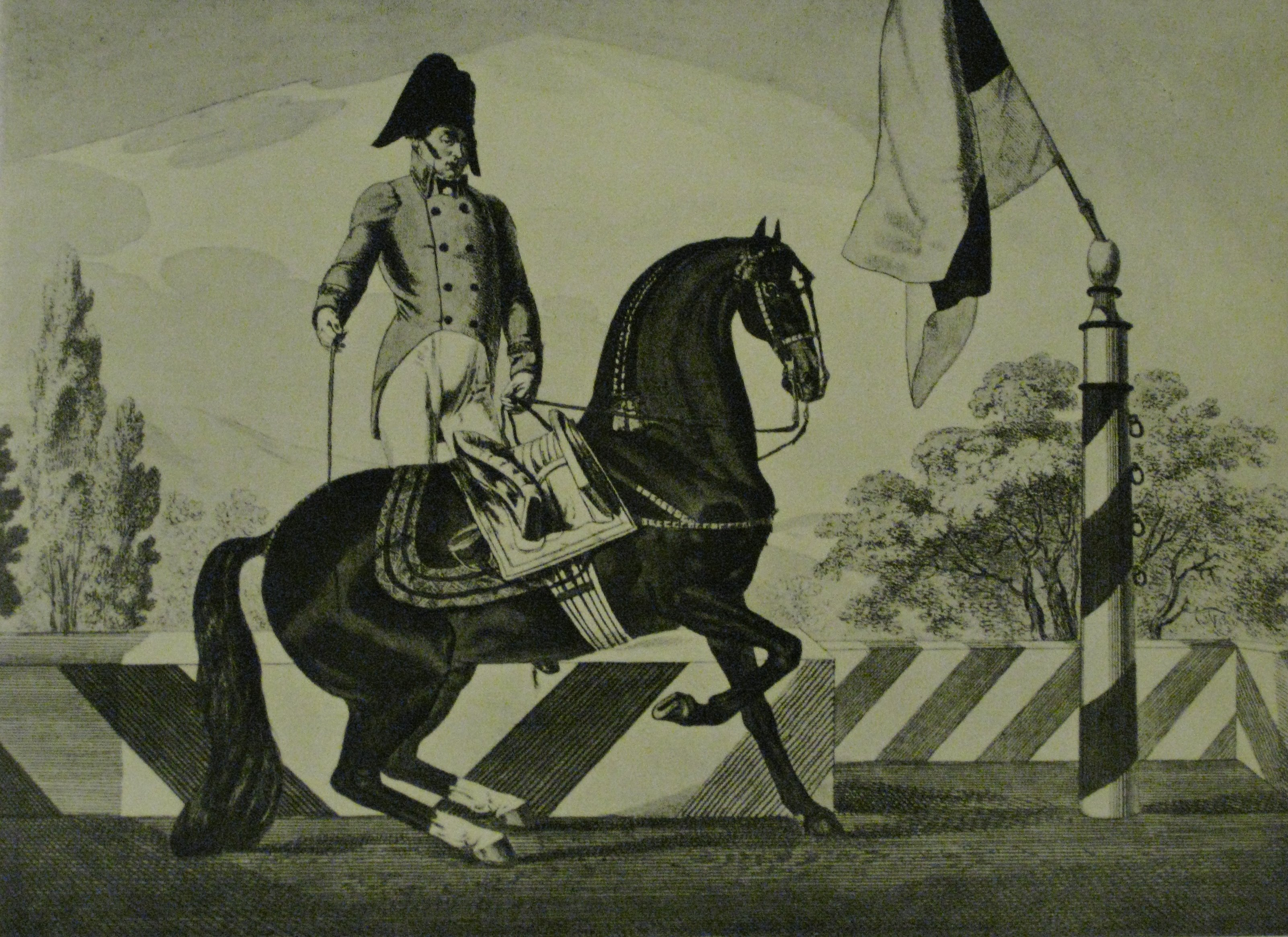
Gottlieb von Weyrother and Conversano Animosa (born at the Court Stud of Koptschan)

His grandfather, Adam Weyrother, a previous Chief Rider at the school, may have known de la Guérinière in Paris. Adam Weyrother traveled to Paris frequently. Maximilian's father and brother Gottlieb were also Chief Riders at the school.

Under Max von Weyrother, the Spanish Riding School became the Mecca for riders of the 19th century. Louis Seeger and E. F. Seidler were his best-known students.

== Published works ==
- Anleitung wie man nach bestimmten Verhältnissen die passendste Stangen-Zäumung finden Kann: nebst einer einfachen Ansicht der Grundsätze der Zäumung Wien: Auf Kosten des Verfassers in Commission bei Schaumburg 1814; revised 2nd edition 1826 "Instructions on how to find the most appropriate bit for given conditions..."
- De l'embouchure du cheval, ou, Méthode por trouver la meilleure forme de mors, d'aprés les proportions et les principes les plus simples de l'embouchure du cheval: suivie de la description d'une bride qui empêche le cheval de se cabrer A Paris: Chez Anselin, successeur de Magimel, librarie pour l'art militaire 1828 (translation of the above)
- Bruchstücke aus den hinterlassenen Schriften des k. k. österr. Oberbereiters Max Ritter von Weyrother 1836
