= François Baucher =

French riding master (1796–1873)

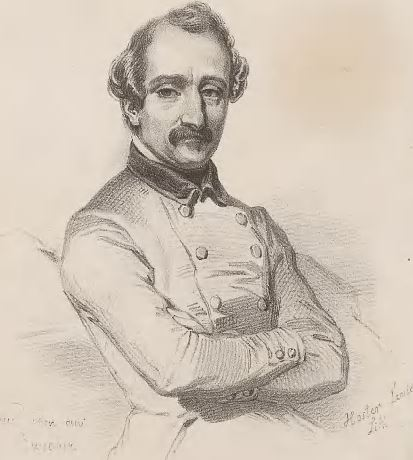
François Baucher

A "baucher" is also a type of bit, named after the man.

François Baucher (1796–1873) was a French riding master whose methods are still debated by dressage enthusiasts today. His philosophy of training the horse changed dramatically over the course of his career and is often considered in two distinct phases or "manners."

== His books ==
Baucher published a number of works on equitation, including the Dictionnaire raisonné d'équitation, "Reasoned dictionary of equitation" in 1833; the Dialogues sur l'équitation, "Dialogues on equitation" (with Louis Charles Pellier) in 1835; and the Passe-temps équestres, "Equestrian pastimes" in 1840.

Baucher's most celebrated work is the Méthode d'équitation basée sur de nouveaux principes, "Method of riding based on new principles"; the earliest extant edition is the third, published in 1842. The numerous following editions up to 1863, when his contract with his publishers expired, are essentially reprints of the same book. The 12th edition, published in 1864 and called the deuxième manière or second manner, contained notable changes from his original method, and was continued in his 13th edition published in 1868.

== Training and riding theories ==
=== The effet d'ensemble ===
Baucher's "first manner" is characterized by an attempt to "annul the instinctive forces" of the horse. To do so, he gradually applied both hands and heels at the halt, his theory being that they should cancel each other out and the horse should stand still. Applying both hands and heels to effect collection was termed the effet d'ensemble.

=== Flexions ===
A prominent aspect of Baucher's method is "flexion" (and relaxation) of the horse's jaw in response to light pressure from either the snaffle or curb bit. Indirectly, this motion was intended to effect flexion at the poll. This part of Baucher's training taught the horse to relax to the bit pressure from the ground - applying gentle but consistent pressure to one side until the horse would "give", then releasing the pressure immediately. Once the horse relaxed to the right and left consistently, he would begin the jaw flexion (in effect, both sides at once, resulting in the horse giving to pressure from the bit to find the release, versus pushing against the bit, tossing his head, etc.).

Baucher also incorporated flexions of the haunches, including rotations of the croup around the shoulders. This intended to teach the horse to keep his haunches straight and to help move them backward in the rein back. The rein back was used to teach the horse to move his whole body mass away from the bit (to increase the power of the hand), and also to help close the angles of the hind legs, which would help increase impulsion.

=== Problems with impulsion ===
Despite the great importance put on the hand and preparation of the forehand, using the reinback to shift the center of gravity backwards and to increase respect for the hand, there is no exercise used by Baucher to increase respect for forward movement and impulsion or preparation of the hindquarters.

Many of Baucher's students had issues with the lack of impulsion resulting from using his technique, and this is indeed one of the greatest criticisms of the method. Some advocated the use of galloping, free gaits, or spurring to get the needed impulsion. Baucher never included an exercise for impulsion in his book. The closest idea he had was a technique of getting the horse to respond extremely quickly off the leg, by barely touching the horse with his calves, before immediately spurring him (without use of hand) if the animal did not immediately move off. However, this technique did not provide a great deal of impulsion.

With the effet d'ensemble established at the halt, Baucher begins work at the walk. If at any time the horse loses the softness of the jaw and neck, it is re-established within the gait or, if it can not be established there, the animal is immediately brought back to the halt until the horse submits. This resulted in a stop-go motion, and much of the work was therefore done at the walk, which Baucher termed "the mother of all gaits" (directly opposing the masters before him, who mostly worked in the trot). Baucher would continue in the walk until he could perform very tight changes of direction. He then moved onto the trot, and transitions between the walk and trot, keeping the effet d'ensemble the whole time.

=== The rassembler ===
The rassembler, an exercise that was meant to increase both mobility and collection. The horse was taught to move its hind legs further underneath his body, concentrating the center of gravity. In the effet d'ensemble, the legs keep constant pressure, with the spurs used at the girth. In the rassembler, the legs were used intermittently, with the spurs applied further towards the flanks. The rein aids were also continuous in the effet d'ensemble, and intermittent in the rassembler, and they contained the horse in the rassembler rather than "pulling back" as in the effet d'ensemble.

This posed a problem, as the horse had been taught in the effet d'ensemble that immobility was the correct response to leg aids. Baucher's horses often became dull to the spur, making "impulsion difficult to obtain." Baucher therefore employed the whip, using taps to get movement from the horse. According to Seeger, who watched Baucher ride in Berlin: The whip seems to be a necessary instrument for Mr. Baucher. One never sees him without it, nor riding without using it ... Mr. Baucher uses it with extraordinary severity.'

=== The "Second Manner" (12th edition to his method) ===
Over the course of his lifetime, Baucher made various modifications to his methodology. Baucher was severely injured during mid-life when a large chandelier fell on him while preparing one of his horses for exhibition. Though this accident is often attributed to the evolution of Baucher's "second manner", there is no indication this is in fact the case. His "second manner" emphasizes the importance of teaching the horse to keep his neck upright, carry it himself without the aid of his rider, and continually sustain his optimal balance and mobility.

The ramener was still used as a control device, however in this latter mode Baucher no longer pulled the horse's nose towards his chest. Instead, he advised the rider push the horse's body closer to its head (fixed by the rider) so that flexion of the poll increased and the head became vertical. This technique had its origins in the rassembler.

The effet d'ensemble was no longer used on horses to re-establish lightness, but for certain horses that were resistant and defensive, in order to achieve submission.

Baucher then began using the half-halt and vibrations to decrease muscular tension. To do so, he rejected his long-time use of simultaneous application of hand and leg, and came up with the idea of 'hand without legs, legs without hand.'

In this method, the rider's hand was used to regulate action and the rider's legs acted to increase impulsion. This was a great change from Baucher's earlier techniques—keeping horses sharp to the leg instead of restraining them in the effet d'ensemble. It also simplified his method, making it easier for the amateur or average horseman to replicate. This method also employed the use of only one rein at a time, instead of both.

== Critical Legacy of Baucher ==
Baucher was controversial during his lifetime and his methods continue to draw divided passions from contemporary horse riders and trainers. Critics among Baucher's own contemporaries included Count Antoine Cartier D'Aure, P.A. Aubert, the Duc de Nemours, M. Thirion, and especially the German equestrian Louis Seeger.

Baucher's method went strongly against the traditional philosophy of his time, which maintained that one could not balance and collect a horse without movement. Baucher believed the opposite, that balance and collection must be developed at a halt before movement should be introduced. He also drew searing criticism due his claim to be the first to articulate a reproducible method of achieving lightness with horses of any conformation or breed.

His most outspoken adversary and rival, Louis Seeger, in 1852 published Herr Baucher und seine Künste - Ein ernstes Wort an Deutschlands Reiter, "Monsieur Baucher and his Methods". Seeger wrote that his impression of the horses was poor, that they lacked energy and impulsion with the hind legs dragging out behind them, especially at the trot, and the hind legs were stiff. He claimed that they were difficult to sit, dead to the leg, moved flat, and traveled on the forehand; that they could not take up even contact with the reins and had great difficulty bending the joints of their hind legs, swishing their tail in displeasure when asked; that they were stiff at the canter, including during the one-tempi flying changes (which were not practiced or believed to be possible before Baucher first trained them), and could not collect, having a canter more hopping than a jumping motion. He further claimed that the piaffe was incorrect, with stiff hind legs and the horses stepping sideways or backwards, the forelegs having little action since the horse was on the forehand, and the hind legs having most of the action. He said the passage was stiff, instead of elastic and springy, and Baucher had to use a great deal of leg, spur, and whip to keep the horse going (contrary to the correct way, where the rider appears to be doing nothing at all), and that horses would throw themselves around in the pirouette, instead of easily turning around.

Contemporary critics include some modern dressage riders who are opposed to Baucher's "first period" training techniques on the basis of its perceived harshness, while the principle of "hand without leg, leg without hand" (from his "second period") has become a widely accepted classical dressage principle. Techniques from his first period are still employed today. In particular, direct and lateral flexions are prescribed by many popular natural horsemanship trainers and clinicians including Pat Parelli and Clinton Anderson. The controversial practice of rollkur is sometimes erroneously labelled Baucherist due to the flexion observed, however Baucher instructed his flexions to be performed on the ground or at a halt, never sustained and not in motion.

Despite the misunderstanding and controversy surrounding Baucher's "first period", many trainers today are finding validity in the work he did during his career. The flexions which Baucher developed, Grand Prix movements such as tempi changes, and the principle of "hand without leg, leg without hand" are all familiar to contemporary students of horsemanship. The beloved and much-studied classical dressage trainer Nuno Oliveira also studied Baucher and, in the words of Bettina Drummond who studied with him for seventeen years, "achieved his phenomenal results by grafting the principles of Baucher onto a classical foundation.".

== Publications ==
- Baucher, François Dictionnaire raisonné d'équitation Rouen: Imprimé par D. Brière 1833 Full text "Reasoned dictionary of equitation"
- Baucher, François and Louis Charles Pellier Dialogues sur l'équitation : premier dialogue entre le grand Hippo-théo, dieu des quadrupèdes, un cavalier et un cheval Paris: Manège Baucher et Pellier 1835 31pp. Full text "Dialogues on equitation: a first dialogue between the great 'Hippo-théo', god of quadrupeds, a rider and a horse"
- Baucher, François Passe-temps équestres: suivis de notes explicatives; Paul Cuzent Musique du travail de Partisan Paris: chez l'auteur 1840 204,18pp. "Equestrian pastimes: followed by explanatory notes"
- — Méthode d'équitation basée sur de nouveaux principes Paris: Impr. de Ve Dondey-Dupré 1842 3rd ed. xxxi,166pp., 12 leaves of plates Full text "Method of riding based on new principles"
- —, [von Willisen] (trans.) Methode der Reitkunst nach neuen Grundsätzen: nebst Anh. u. Zusätze Berlin: A. Duncker 1843 vi,[iii]-x,[3]-128,78pp., 6 plates (translation of the Méthode d'équitation , with 78 page supplement)
- —, H. Ritgen (trans.) Erläuterndes Wörterbuch der Reitkunst Leipzig 1844 (translation of the Dictionnaire raisonné)
