= Egon von Neindorff (dressage) =

German equestrian trainer (1923-2004)

- Born: November 1, 1923; Döbeln, Germany
- Died: May 19, 2004 (aged 80); Karlsruhe, Germany
- Occupation: Dressage Master
- Relatives: Egon von Neindorff (father)

Egon von Neindorff (November 1, 1923, in Döbeln, Saxony – May 19, 2004) had a Riding Institution at Karlsruhe, Germany, where he trained horses and taught dressage. He was a teacher and his methods are the standard for the German School. One of his famous students is Erik Herbermann, author of the Dressage Formula. Von Neindorff was author of a book, The Art of Classical Horsemanship.

Von Neindorff first learned the art of riding from his father, Egon von Neindorff, and later from Felix Bürkner, Richard Wätjen, Ludwig Zeiner, Otto Lörke and also Alois Podhajsky. Von Neindorff founded the first riding school to be established after World War II, initially concentrating on jousting. In 1949, he moved his school to Karlsruhe, where he remained until his death. He was awarded the Bundesverdienstkreuz and the German Rider Cross in Gold.

== Foundation ==
In 1991, Egon von Neindorff founded the "EGON-VON-NEINDORFF-STIFTUNG" (foundation), which was later joined by the State of Baden-Württemberg and the city of Karlsruhe. Its goal is the preservation of Classical Dressage up to the level of High School by training horses and talented riders along with special efforts in supporting younger riders.

The foundation continues his teachings at the historical site in Karlsruhe, a former Telegraph Casern in the west of Karlsruhe, covering a closed area of approximately 10.000 square meters.

Offered are horses of various training levels to the public. Riding lessons for groups (adults and children) take place on a daily basis. Other offers include private riding lessons, vaulting lessons, and training of seat and posture in longing lessons.

== Association ==
The Association for Classical Riding Art following Egon von Neindorff was founded in 1989. Its goal is to sustain the Classical Dressage as it is taught at the Institute and to preserve it for the future. It works towards keeping the spirit alive of the interaction between man and horse, as taught by Egon von Neindorff and lived and demonstrated by him throughout all of his life.

== Bibliography ==
- The Art of Classical Horsemanship
