= Gustav Steinbrecht =

Gustav Steinbrecht (1808–1885) is considered one of the masters of dressage. His advice "Reite dein Pferd vorwärst und richte es gerade" (Ride your horse forward, and ride it straight) is one of the foundation principles of German dressage training.

== Biography ==
Steinbrecht was born in 1808 in Ampfurth, a village near Oschersleben in the Börde district of Saxony, which at that time was a province of Prussia. He studied veterinary medicine in Berlin before spending eight years at the manège at Moabit under the celebrated dressage trainer Louis Seeger. It was there that he met his wife, Seeger's niece. From 1834 to 1842 he directed a private manège in Magdeburg, and then returned to Berlin to work again with Seeger. In 1849 Steinbrecht took over as director of Seeger's manège and began work on a book on horsemanship. In 1859 he acquired his own manège in Dessau, but returned once again to Berlin in 1865, where he continued to train horses almost until his death. His book was expanded and edited by Paul Plinzner and published posthumously as Das Gymnasium des Pferdes, "The Gymnasium of the Horse" in 1886. The date of publication is often incorrectly given as 1885 in bibliographies such as that of Huth. A second edition was published in 1892, and a third in 1901.

== Quotes ==
"Ride your horse forward and straight." (Sometimes quoted as "...make him straight" or "...keep him straight.")

"...all [training exercises] follow one another in such a way that the preceding exercise always constitutes a secure basis for the next one. Violations of this rule will always exert payment later on; not only by a triple loss of time but very frequently by resistances, which for a long time if not forever interfere with the relationship between horse and rider."

“If the art were not so difficult we would have plenty of good riders and excellently ridden horses, but as it is the art requires, in addition to everything else, character traits that are not combined in everyone: inexhaustible patience, firm perseverance under stress, courage combined with quiet alertness. If the seed is present only a true, deep love for the horse can develop these character traits to the height that alone will lead to the goal.”

== Published works ==
- Das Gymnasium des Pferdes Potsdam: Döring 1886 "The Gymnasium of the Horse"
