= François Robichon de La Guérinière =

French riding-master

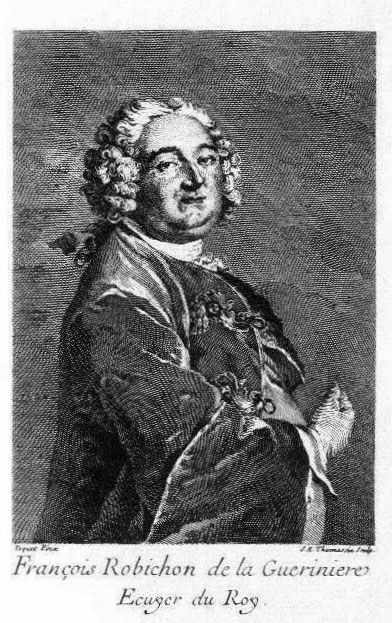
- Born: 8 May 1688; Essay, Province of Normandy, France
- Died: 2 July 1751 (aged 63); Paris
- Occupations: riding master, writer on dressage
- Writing career
- Language: French
- Period: Baroque
- Notable work: Ecole de Cavallerie

François Robichon de La Guérinière (1688–1751) was a French riding master who had a profound effect on accepted methods for horse training, and one of the most influential writers on the art of dressage.

== History ==
De La Guérinière was born on 8 May 1688 at Essay, near Alençon in Normandy, France. He spent most of his early years in Normandy. Although his brother Pierre des Brosses de La Guérinière directed the Académie d'équitation in Caen, originally established in 1594 by another French master, Antoine de Pluvinel, de La Guérinière's most influential instructor was de Vendeuil.

In 1715, de La Guérinière received his diploma as an écuyer du roi, and he began as a director of an equestrian academy in Paris, a position which he held for 15 years and which earned him a reputation as an instructor and rider. This led to an appointment by the Grand écuyer de France, Prince Charles of Lorraine, as Directeur du Manège des Tuileries in 1730. He held the position of Equerry to Louis XIV until his death in 1751.

== Riding theories ==
De La Guérinière is credited for the invention of the shoulder-in, which he called the "alpha and omega of all exercises"; he was the first to describe it. His treatise L'École de Cavalerie, "The School of Horsemanship", which was published in parts between 1729 and 1731, and as a complete work in 1733, is an important book on the training of the horse, detailing equitation, veterinary treatment, and general horsemanship. This book has become an important text for the Spanish Riding School of Vienna.

De La Guérinière gave exercises to increase suppleness and balance of the horse, and a progressive schooling system to reach an overall goal: a light, obedient, calm horse that was a pleasure to ride. De La Guérinière is also credited with the invention of the flying change and the counter-canter.

In his book, Ecole de Cavallerie (Paris, 1733), de La Guérinière stresses the use of few aids and punishments while riding. He advises the use of the shoulder-in at all gaits, including the gallop. De La Guérinière states the rider must also have a good seat in order to have a soft, light hand, and makes several references to William Cavendish, 1st Duke of Newcastle.

== Published works ==
- Ecole de Cavallerie: contenant un Recueil ou abregé Methodique des Principes qui regardent la connoissance des Chevaux... [S. l] Mernier 1730
- Ecole de cavalerie contenant l'ostéologie etc. Sieur de La Guérinière, 4e leçon, Paris: Jacques Guerin, 1731
- École de cavalerie, contenant la connoissance, l'instruction et la conservation du cheval, avec figures en taille douce, par M. de La Guérinière.... Paris: impr. de J. Collombat, 1733
- Elémens de cavalerie: Contenant la connoissance du cheval, l'embouchure, la ferrure, la selle, &c. avec un traité du haras. Paris: chez les frères Guerin, 1741
- Manuel de Cavalerie: ou l'on enseigne... la connoissance du Cheval l'embouchure... l'osteologie du cheval, ses maladies, & leurs remedes.... La Haye: Chez Jean Van Duren, 1742 (same as the above, according to Brunet)
- École de cavalerie, contenant la connoissance, l'instruction et la conservation du cheval. Avec figures en taille-douce. Par M. de La Guérinière,.... Paris: Huart et Moreau, 1751
