= Étienne Beudant =

French officer and equestrian (1863–1949)

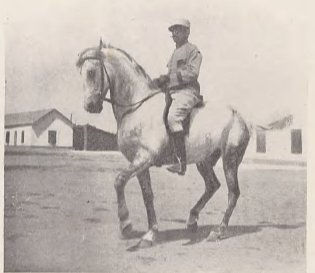
- Beudant and his Barb Mabrouk on the piaffe
- Born: 30 December 1863; 16th arrondissement of Paris
- Died: 12 January 1949 (aged 85) Dax, Landes
- Service years: 1884–1920

Étienne Beudant (1863–1949), nicknamed "l'écuyer mirobolant" by General Decarpentry, was a French equestrian. He studied riding with Faverot de Kerbrech, then became a cavalry officer at Saumur, following in the footsteps of François Baucher. During his military career, he distinguished himself by training many difficult horses that no one else could ride. He published on the subject of horses in North Africa during his tour of duty there. After becoming a captain and being seriously wounded in 1917, he retired to Dax in 1920. There, he trained his mare Vallerine until his health prevented him from riding.

Beudant's talent was noted by other equestrians, both contemporaries and non-contemporaries, including his pupil René Bacharach, Patrice Franchet d'Espèrey, and General Donnio. Writer Jérôme Garcin dedicated a novelized biography to him, entitled L'Écuyer mirobolant, which won the Prix Pégase in 2011.

== Biography ==
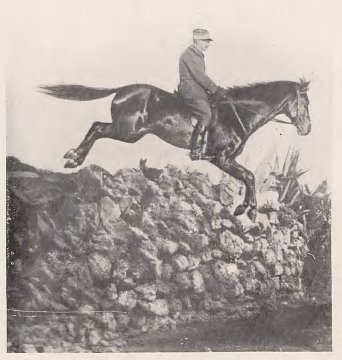
Étienne Beudant and his Anglo-Barb horse Robertsart II outdoors

Étienne Pierre François Arthur Marie Beudant was born in the 16th arrondissement of Paris on 30 December 1863. He is the son of Albert Beudant and his wife, née Marie Charey.

He joined the 23rd Dragoon Regiment as a volunteer in 1883, where he met General Faverot de Kerbrech and watched him workhorses (including the famous Bouton d'Or) until the summer of 1885. He was not initiated directly by Faverot but was trained according to Baucher's famous precept of "hands without legs, legs without hands" by Lieutenant Wagner. He was also fortunate enough to receive training notes from General Faverot, passed on to him by another lieutenant. He observed the general a great deal himself and reported on this in his later writings. In particular, he applied the "hand without legs, legs without hands", which he transformed into "hand without legs". Trained at Saumur Cavalry School as a cavalry officer, Beudant belongs to the line of French Baucherist equestrians "of the last manner".

He was promoted to brigadier, then to fourrier in 1884. From maréchal des logis in 1885, he became a cadet at Saumur in 1887, then second lieutenant in the 24th Dragons Regiment in 1888, and lieutenant in the 11th Cuirassiers Regiment in 1891. During his years as an officer, he tamed some twenty stubborn horses that no other soldier could manage to ride. In 1892, he spent a year in Montana, and the following year became administrator of a mixed commune in French Algeria. In 1901, he became captain of the 5th regiment of African chasseurs. During his career in North Africa, he published several studies on Arabian, Barb, and Tunisian horses. He was an avid horse trainer and showed some of his animals at racecourses in Morocco, where he won several races. According to his testimony, throughout his military career, his superiors criticized him for riding too much. In his fictionalized biography, writer Jérôme Garcin describes him as a secretive, non-careerist man, a "little captain, with no ambition other than the derisory one of making his horses prouder".

In 1903, at the age of 40, he rescued the mare Barbe Bakhta from the ill-treatment of a cart driver. He then made the transition from cavalry to armor in the French Army. On 12 January 1916, he was made a Knight of the Legion of Honor. In 1917, at the age of 54, his horse was killed and he was seriously wounded in the hips when his mount fell on top of him, an injury from which he never recovered.

He was retired from the military in 1920. He retired to Dax in 1922, where from 1925 to 1927 he trained the Anglo-Arabian mare Vallerine, which he had inherited from Dutch officers. In 1927, having become too old to ride, Beudant entrusted his mare to his friend Captain Bernard, with an 81-page letter that constitutes a "veritable instruction manual for horses" and a "remarkable effort at transmission", which Patrice Franchet d'Espèrey sees as "initiatory in nature". At the end of his life, he was in constant pain from his injuries but, according to Bacharach, who met him at the time, maintained a noble attitude and "lit up at the mention of his horses". He died on 16 January 1949 in Dax.

== His horses ==
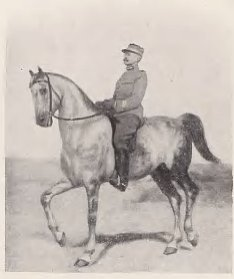
Beudant and the Anglo-Arab Nethou II

Constantly in search of light riding, Beudant works tirelessly with his horses and has written several books. He aimed to show that even modest horses can produce great results. He is particularly renowned for training difficult animals, including:

- Hamïa, a Barb mare (1907–1910) suffering from "dementia", whom he turned into a formidable outdoor horse;
- Vieux Jeu II, a thoroughbred (1908–1910) "full of faults and restive", also trained for the outdoors;
- Robertsart II (1910–1916), an Anglo-Barb, his most famous horse, who requires six men to hold him before he can be ridden. Ridden in show jumping, he won in cross-country and steeplechase;
- Mabrouk (1914–1916), an entire Barb "impossible to ride in line" and reformed, who became a good outdoor and high school horse;
- Iris, bay Anglo-Arabian gelding (1915–1916), trained for racing and steeplechasing;
- Nethou II, an Anglo-Arabian gelding (1916–1917) nicknamed "le splendide";
- Mimoun, a Beard gelding (1919–1922) initially "soft and timid", now an excellent high school horse;
- Vallerine, an Anglo-Arabian mare (1925–1927) whom Beudant trained to a very high level at the end of his life, despite his physical suffering, and with whom he felt "he had achieved and surpassed the goal he had set himself".

== Recognition ==
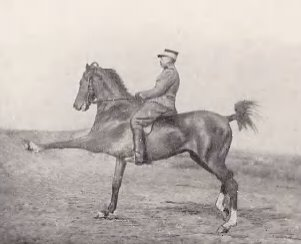
Beudant and the horse Barbe Mimoun in extended trot

His talent and skill on horseback were praised by some of his contemporaries, but Beudant generally remained in the shadows, although he is now considered "one of the most gifted horsemen of his time". General Decarpentry said of him: "Beudant is the most miraculous squire I have ever met – I have not known an executor who could compare with him – I saw Mabrouk and his haute-école work was beyond belief". In 1920, he sent him a letter in which he spoke of Étienne Beudant as a true equerry, a virtuoso of the equestrian art, comparing himself to a simple riding teacher.

Veterinary colonel Monod (director of the troops' veterinary service and head of breeding in Morocco) acknowledges "absolute self-control, unfailing patience, firmness combined with gentleness, sustained observation, sound judgment, impeccable posture – all these qualities Beudant possesses to such a degree that in the training of his horses, misfires are unknown". General Henrys, commander-in-chief in Morocco from 1915 to 1916, said: "I have seen all the great horsemen of my generation work, including General l'Hotte. None of them left me with the impression of Beudant's ideal perfection.

Three former head squires at the Saumur Cavalry School said of him, respectively, that he "showed real talent in equitation" (De Contades), that it would be "a joy to be criticized by a Master like him" (Danloux) and that he "knew admirably how to emphasize the great principles that General Faverot applied so well" (Lesage).

Lieutenant-Colonel Margot dedicates a photo as follows: "To Captain Beudant, our common master, Commandant Margot, Chief Squire at the École de Cavalerie, in all humility". General Donnio goes so far as to say that "you can't talk about Beudant's riding, he was a sorcerer! When René Bacharach repeated these words, Beudant replied that "he's not a sorcerer, but he's worked hard". René Bacharach met Étienne Beudant at the end of his life to become his pupil, and speaks of him as a man imbued with "kindness, wisdom and self-control", praising his complete practice of equitation, both in difficult terrain and in riding schools. Patrice Franchet d'Espèrey sees in Étienne Beudant and René Bacharach the continuators of François Baucher's last teachings, both demonstrating great kindness and respect for the horse, within the framework of a master-student relationship in which the respect of the student for the master is mingled with the affection of the master for the student.

== Precepts ==
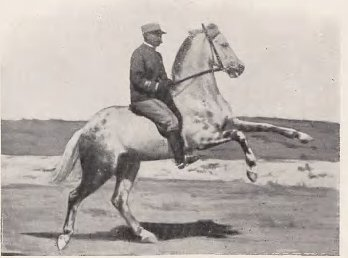
Beudant and his horse Barb Mabrouk galloping on three legs.

Beudant is a very humble and rather discreet horse rider, for whom "a method is only as good as the results it gives". He pays constant tribute to the master riders who preceded him and whose precepts he applies, but he does not agree with all of them. For example, he disagreed with Faverot de Kerbrech on the subject of bringing back, which he reserved for the high school for a time, before proposing to do without it altogether in his Dressage du cheval de selle. He took a particular approach to high school work, considering that leaning and shoulder-in were useless and dangerous diversions and that easing and side-stepping were unnecessary. Instead, he works on the straightness of the horse's hips and shoulders, an approach derived from military riding. For him, "the key to the mysteries of learned equitation is the lightness obtained without taking anything from the impulsion". In his book Extérieur et haute école, he asserts that "everywhere, therefore, in outdoor riding as in high school, success belongs to he who best applies to the horse the maxim of Baucher, the inimitable artist who amazed his contemporaries (General L'Hotte): 'Let him believe he is his master, and then he is our slave'. That, in my opinion, is the equestrian truth".

=== Respect for the horse ===
One aspect of Beudant's equestrian teaching lies in his principles of respect for the horse, the search for natural attitudes and the simplification of aids, in line with ethological riding at the beginning of the 21st century. Like his pupil René Bacharach, he was ahead of his time.

He gave the horse as much freedom as possible, attempting to "imitate nature" to help it regain its attitude. His whole approach is based on the idea of acting as little as possible as a rider, to let the horse act as much as possible on its own. In Extérieur et Haute École, he talks about his "principles of dressage which want the horse to be light in the spurs as well as in the hand, which do not admit shifts in attitude as aids, and which let the horse act on his own as soon as he has been given the position". Beudant speaks of teaching horses as an instructive game, a salutary exercise that never leads to fatigue. He advises against wrestling, which always leads to after-effects in the horse's mind and damage to his body and organism. In his opinion, it's important to avoid annoying the animal, and not to act unnecessarily. When faced with a horse that does not obey, Beudant asserts that the rider must always blame himself and that the majority of faults come from the rider, who attacks the effects rather than seeking the cause of his horse's reluctance.

He also advises the rider to step back and allow the horse to act on its own and position itself according to its equilibrium. His advice also includes "Observe the free horse and reflect", and "Ask often; be content with little; reward much", a famous precept he takes from Faverot de Kerbrech.

=== Fixed hand ===
Beudant has taken Baucher's famous "main sans jambes, jambes sans main" and simplified it to "main sans jambes": according to his doctrine, "la main fixe suffit à tout". All equestrian practices can be carried out with the fixed hand, which Beudant describes as "the hand that allows itself to be attracted neither by the horse's mouth nor by the rider's wrist". According to René Bacharach's testimony, Beudant has acquired a very controlled position in the saddle, demonstrating great ease, with a very deep seat that allows him to avoid using his legs at all. His hand is light and steady, and the horse responds to the slightest stimulus. This doctrine is one of his last equestrian teachings. The fixed hand, combined with the impulse in the legs and spurs, is also enough, according to him, to render softening unnecessary.

== Publications ==
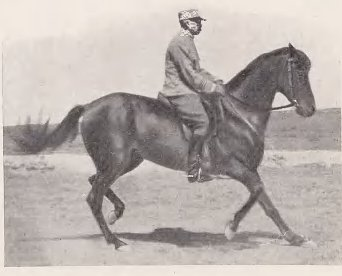
Beudant on Robertsart II, his most famous horse, trotting backward.

=== During his lifetime ===
- Cheval d'amateur, son dressage simple et rationnel, 1912.
- Extérieur et Haute École: Avec 14 planches hors texte, 1923.
- Dressage du cheval de selle : Avec 12 gravures, Nancy-Paris-Strasbourg, 1929.
- Horse training out-door and high school, 1931.
- Extérieur et Haute école, 1923.
- La doma del Caballo de Silla, 1931.
- Dressage du cheval de selle.
- Souvenirs équestres, 1934.
- Dressage du cheval de selle, 1938.
- Dressage du cheval de selle, 1948.

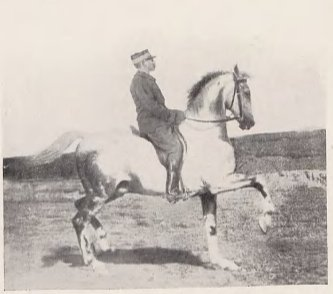
Beudant with brilliant piaffe on Mabrouk. This photo is used as cover illustration for some of the reprinted editions of his works.

=== Posthumous ===
- Horse training. Out-door and high school, 1950.
- Main sans jambes : suivi de Dressage du cheval de selle, 1987.
- Extérieur et haute école, 1988.
- Vallerine, 2005.
- Extérieur et Haute École, 2008, 2nd ed.

== Fictionalized biography ==
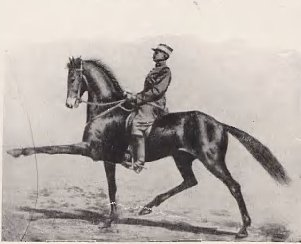
Beudant and Robertsart II at a trot in sustained extension.

Étienne Beudant's life inspired French writer Jérôme Garcin, who published the novel L'Écuyer mirobolant with Gallimard in 2010. In the book, he presents the horseman as a man who loved horses at a time when they were utilitarian animals, understood them better than anyone else, and refused to break or subdue his mounts, achieving lightness in riding without the use of force or aids. Télérama describes it as a "meditative and uncluttered" novel. Le Nouvel Observateur sees Jérôme Garcin as a novelist who depicts the destiny of the squire "with the graces of an orientalist painter, perfectly paced prose, and the admiration of a disciple anxious to make a master known". According to Patrice Franchet d'Espèrey, Garcin "develops a portrait of incredible verisimilitude". In 2011, the novel was awarded the Prix Pégase Cadre Noir with the distinction "Art et littérature", in recognition of Beudant's emotional reading and image of sensitivity and modesty.

== See also ==
- Equestrianism
- Equestrianism in France

== Bibliography ==
- Beudant, Étienne (1923). Extérieur et Haute École (PDF) (in French) (1st ed.). Librairie des sciences agricoles.
- Beudant, Étienne (2005). Vallerine : Le testament d'un écuyer (in French). Favre SA.
- Beudant, Étienne (2008). Extérieur et Haute École. Arts équestres (in French) (2nd ed.). Actes Sud. ISBN 978-2-7427-7629-0.
- Beudant, Étienne (1929). Dressage du cheval de selle : Avec 12 gravures (in French). impr.-éditions Berger-Levrault.
- Bacharach, René (1966). La haute et discrète figure du capitaine Beudant, écuyer hors de pair (1863–1949) (in French). L'année hippique.
- Monteilhet, André (2009). Les Maîtres de l'œuvre équestre : suivi de Les Mémorables du cheval. Arts équestres (in French). Actes Sud. ISBN 978-2-7427-8633-6.
- Franchet, Patrice (2008). La main du maître : réflexions sur l'héritage équestre (in French). Odile Jacob. ISBN 978-2-7381-2033-5.
- Garcin, Jérôme (2010). L'Écuyer mirobolant : roman (in French). Gallimard. ISBN 978-2-286-06467-9.
