= Equestrianism in France =

Equine sport in France

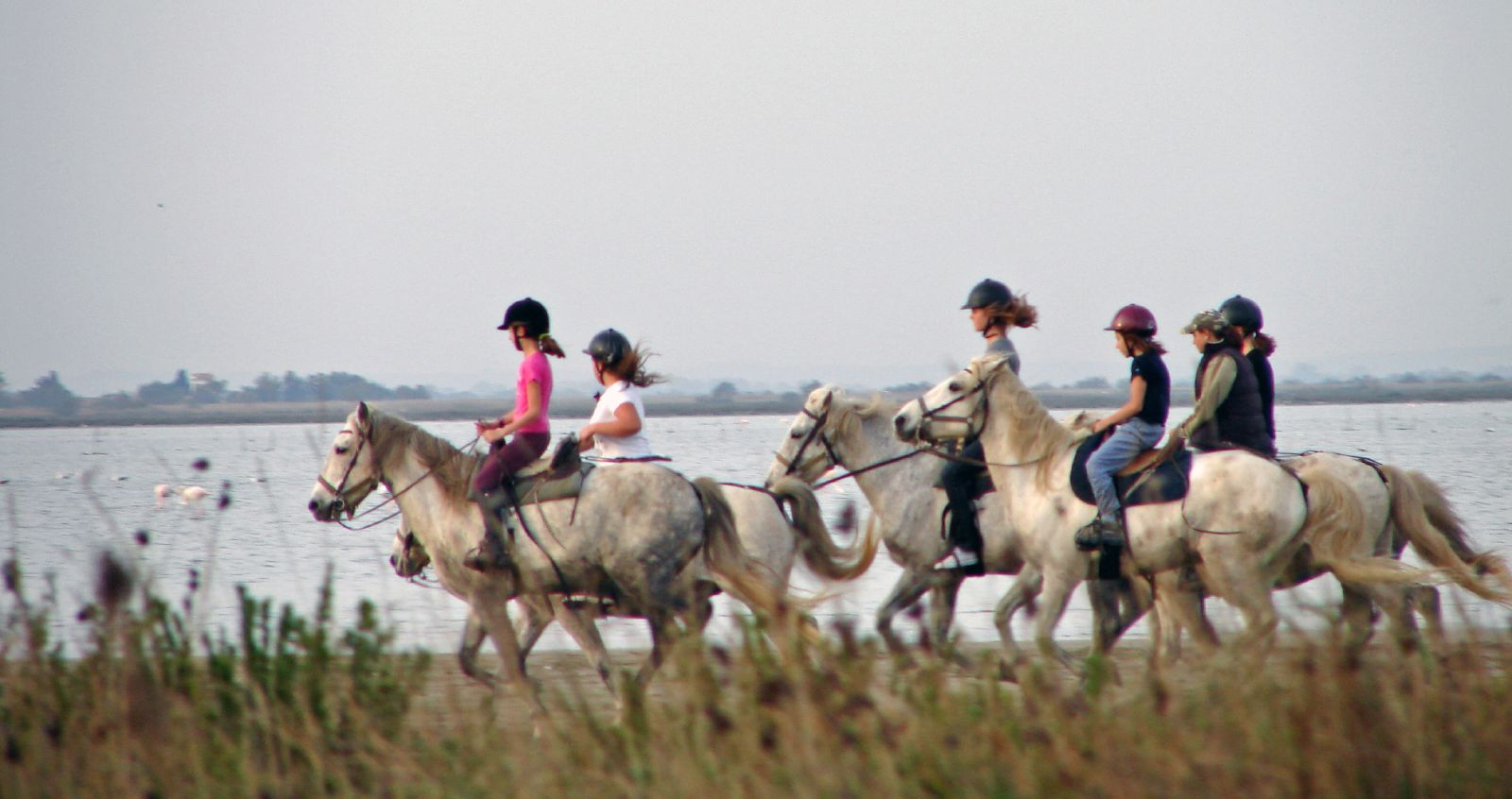
- Horseback riding in the Camargue, France
- Clubs: 8 663 (2016)

Equestrianism is the third most popular Olympic sport in France, and the leading sport for women.

Stemming from military practices and a long tradition of teaching by equestrians such as La Guérinière and François Baucher, traditional French equestrianism is essentially represented at the Cadre Noir de Saumur. The practice of equestrianism has evolved towards sport and leisure, opening up to the general public. At the end of the 20th century, the sport became much more democratic, with a sharp rise in the number of riders, particularly young people and women. The teaching of equestrianism as a leisure sport in France is based on the existence of over 8,000 riding schools, which make trained horses available to the public. Their establishment is supported by the French government thanks to a reduced VAT rate from 2004 to 2013. At the end of 2013, riders and industry professionals protested against the increase in VAT on their activity.

France's 2.3 million professional and occasional riders are mostly middle-class, and enjoy contact with nature. The equestrianism industry employs around 45,000 people. A wide variety of disciplines are represented in France, from eventing to horse-ball and endurance, all of which are codified in France, but show jumping accounts for almost 80% of competitions. France is the world's leading organizer of equestrian competitions affiliated to the Fédération équestre internationale, and the leading destination for equestrian tourism. Many professional French riders win medals. Pierre Jonquères d'Oriola remains the most successful show jumper, while Michel Robert and Alexandra Ledermann have also won titles. Eventing also boasts champions such as Jean-Lou Bigot, Jean Teulère and Nicolas Touzaint. France is also one of the leading nations in equestrian endurance. The show business has made a name for itself thanks to artists such as Bartabas, founder of the Académie du Spectacle Equestre de Versailles.

Several official bodies are involved in equestrianism, including the Fédération française d'équitation, which awards the diplomas known as "Galops", the Société hippique française, the Groupement hippique national pour les centers équestres and the Institut français du cheval et de l'équitation, created in 2010 by the merger of the national stud farms and the École nationale d'équitation. Despite the existence of a number of specialist press titles and two Equidia channels devoted to the subject on television, equestrianism remains a low-profile media activity. It has, however, benefited from major advertising campaigns by the French Equitation Federation, using the childish slogan "Le cheval c'est trop génial" ("Horses are so cool").

== History ==
=== Military and scholarly tradition ===
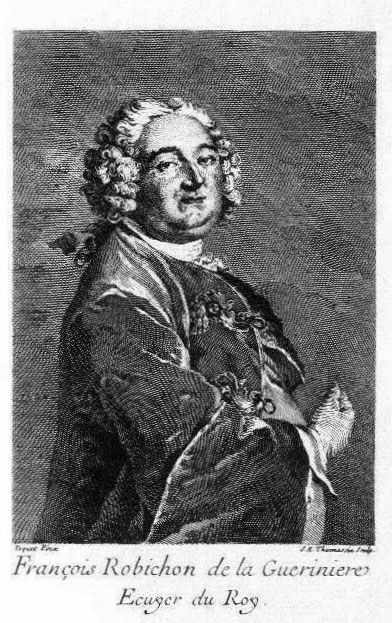
François Robichon de La Guérinière, the "father of French equitation"

The history of French equestrianism is almost exclusively "military and learned". Although very basic until the 7th century, particularly among the Gauls and Romans, equestrianism flourished with the arrival of the stirrup and more suitable saddles in the society of knights. The introduction of firearms put an end to the domination of heavy cavalry in the 15th century, and riding became a learned art in the early 16th century, under the impetus of the Italians. The aim was to ask the horse to make movements that would "get rid of pedestrians". Salomon de La Broue and Antoine de Pluvinel were the precursors of traditional French equitation. The former's method is known from his book Le cavalerice français (1602). The practice of easing the horse and working on stakes enables the rider to practice airs relevés and airs au-dessus du sol. Learning equitation was a rite of passage for French nobility. François Robichon de La Guérinière is regarded as the "father of French equitation", and his influence extends far beyond France's borders, as the Spanish School of Vienna was founded on his teachings.

La Guérinière's legacy was called into question in the mid-18th century, when court equestrianism showed its limitations in the face of military equitation. Military cavalry schools, notably those in Paris and Saumur, taught horseback riding exclusively for war, to train cavalry. The French Revolution led to their abolition. From 1825 onwards, the history of French-style equitation became intertwined with the Saumur Cavalry School, the future Cadre Noir. Two great equestrians, the Viscount d'Aure and François Baucher, opposed their principles, which were eventually brought together in the doctrine of General Alexis L'Hotte, and his famous motto: "Calm, forward and straight". Until 1945, at the Saumur school, the horse was seen only as a military animal. These military and scholarly equestrian practices continued into the 21st century, but in the meantime French society was turning largely to sport and leisure, which opened up new outlets for equitation. The preservation of traditional French equestrianism took shape with the training mission of the Cadre Noir de Saumur, and the creation of the École Nationale d'Equitation in 1972.

Before the advent of motorized transport, equestrianism and carriage driving were part of everyday life for many French people. The division of départements in 1790 meant that, in principle, every Frenchman could reach the prefecture of his département in less than a day's riding.

=== Development of equestrianism and equestrian sport ===
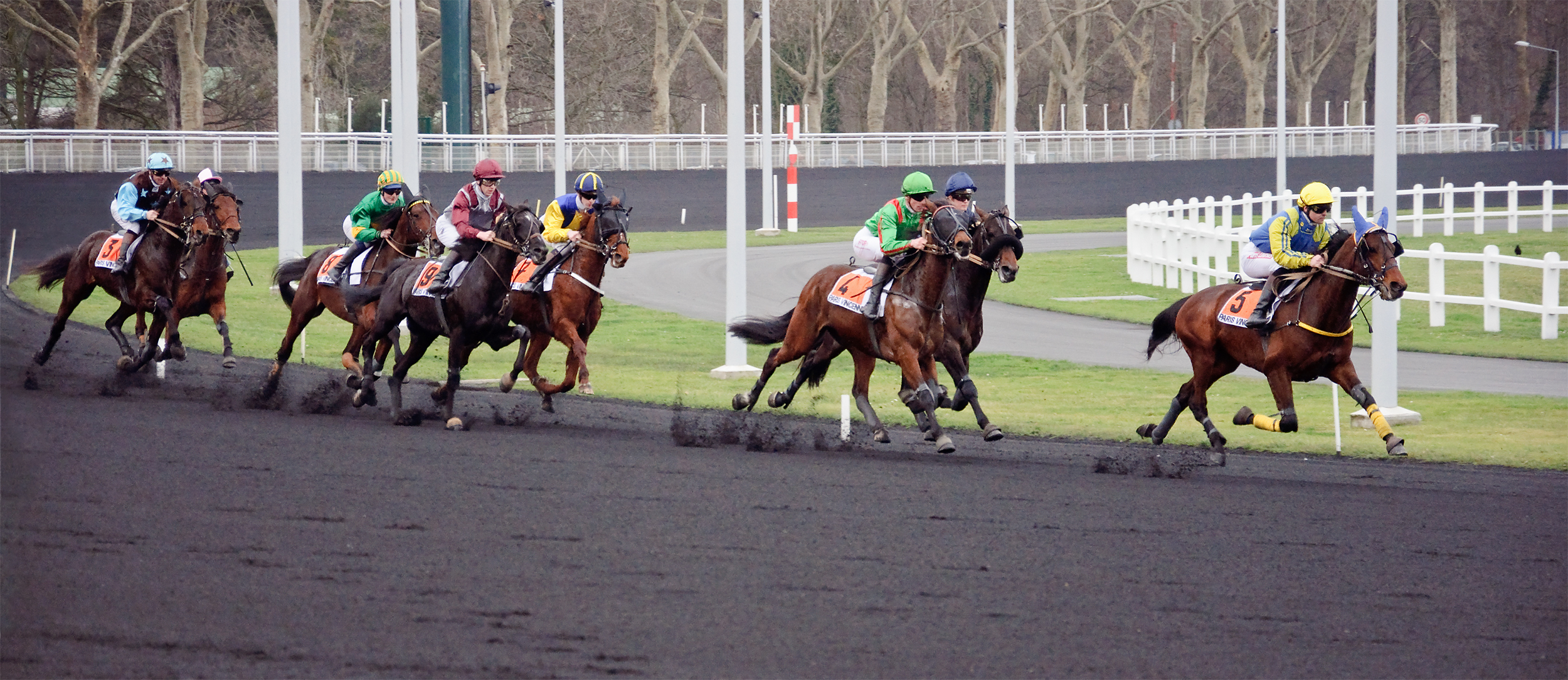
Mounted trotting race at the Vincennes Racecourse

The beginnings of equestrianism in France coincided with the development of horse racing and steeplechase racing in England. Although the principle of horse racing had long been known, it wasn't until the end of the 18th century that English-style racing was introduced in France, and only at the end of the following century that it was codified. At the time, the sport was essentially reserved for the social elite. In 1865, the Société hippique française was founded to improve the breeding of thoroughbred racehorses. The 20th century saw the democratization of horseracing, which became a popular sport. The PMU was created in 1931 and the tiercé in 1954. However, it was the lure of gambling rather than the love of the horse that attracted the public to equestrian sports.

Through the military, equestrianism developed as a sport. Cavalry training included obstacle courses. The first equestrian endurance raids were a military creation, as was the cheval d'armes course, which was to become the equestrian event. The rules were organized with the integration of the three Olympic equestrian sports (show jumping, dressage and eventing) in Stockholm in 1912. France joined the Fédération équestre internationale and created the Fédération française des sports équestres (FFSE) in 1921. It worked with the Société hippique française to organize equestrianism in the country until 1943, when it became autonomous. As military cavalries lost their role, regional equestrianism leagues were gradually set up in France to promote civilian riding. As early as 1933, the Haras Nationaux saw the value of supporting the development of civilian equestrianism and promoted rural and urban equestrian societies. The FFSE was attached to the Ministry of Youth and Sport, and became the only organization authorized to manage equestrian sports in France. Many former military riders, deprived of their role in the army, became civilian equestrianism teachers. Until the 1950s, French equestrianism remained highly elitist, reserved for a privileged few, with the aim of training sport riders.

The demilitarization of equestrianism can be seen in the transition of the Cadre Noir de Saumur to civilian status in 1969. It too was attached to the Ministry of Sports. It was also at the end of the 1960s that the last civilian equestrianism teachers from military backgrounds retired, making way for a new generation of civilian riders. The changeover took around twenty-five years, or one generation.

=== Opening up to the general public ===
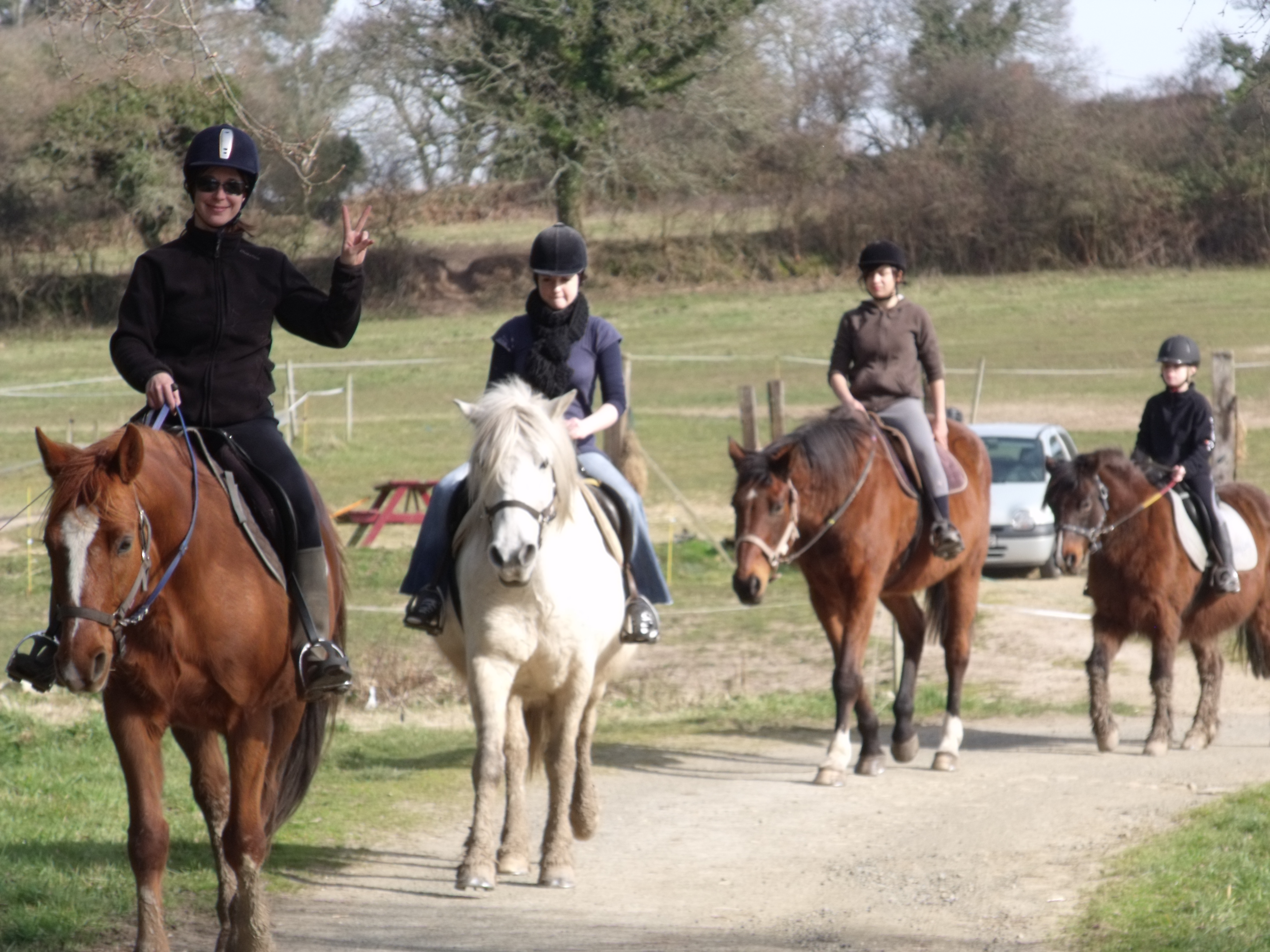
Trail riding, as seen here in Brittany, is symptomatic of the shift toward riding for leisure.

From the 1960s onwards, new riders from outside the military world began to seek leisure activities close to nature and contact with horses, for a purpose other than sport. In 1963, the Association nationale pour le tourisme équestre (National Association for Equestrian Tourism) was created independently, with the help of the national stud farms, to meet the demand for outdoor leisure sports. The number of equestrians in France rose spectacularly, from 30,000 after the Second World War to 620,000 in 2001, of whom 432,500 were members of the French equestrianism Federation. The arrival of these new riders has revolutionized the equestrian landscape, introducing a new culture and a new relationship with the animal. Equestrian practices, exotic or scorned by classic military riders, are developing.

From the 1950s onwards, horse trekking and, above all, horse tourism enabled people to organize their vacations around equestrianism. However, before any structure was put in place, unscrupulous horse-rental companies proliferated in tourist areas, with insufficient respect for animals. Pony equestrianism, influenced by the Anglo-Saxons, brings children closer to the world of horses from an early age. Ponies became an integral part of the "classes vertes" program in the 1970s, and the Poney Club de France was created in 1971 with the support of the Haras. Pony-riding made its debut in schools. This trend is indicative of the democratization of the sport. In 1965, the first state equestrian diplomas were awarded. The 1970s saw a rapprochement between the various equestrian organizations in France. In 1999, a reform definitively merged the three entities managing pony riding, equestrian tourism and equestrian sports into a single FFE.

Equestrian practices became more playful (pony-games), like horse-ball, codified in France in 1978. Exotic equestrianism such as western riding and doma vaquera, among others, were emulated, creating a demand for saddle horses with better handling and more character than the reformed racehorses that made up almost all the teaching staff at riding schools. Equestrian facilities are also developing for private clients, allowing anyone to get close to horses and learn how to ride and care for them. Similarly, the development of "gîtes d'étapes" and equestrian farms enabled private individuals to practice equitation without any federal supervision, as the 200,000 independent riders estimated at the end of the 20th century were fond of riding alone.

Equitation has developed thanks to a reduced tax rate (VAT at 5.5% from 2004 to 2013), which has enabled many riding schools to be set up, with strong growth over the decade 2000. The number of riders has increased by 60%. Equestrian facilities play a major role in the "democratization" phenomenon. Ethnologist Jean-Pierre Digard refers to the "massification" of horse riding.

Years	1984	1985	1990	1995	2000	2005	2006	2007	2008	2009	2010	2011	2012	2013	2014	2015	2016
Trends in equestrian licenses in France	145,071	147,108	214,007	325,670	434,980	513,615	523,696	553,560	600,805	650,437	687,334	705,783	706,449	694,480	689,044	673,026	663,194

=== Equitaxe ===
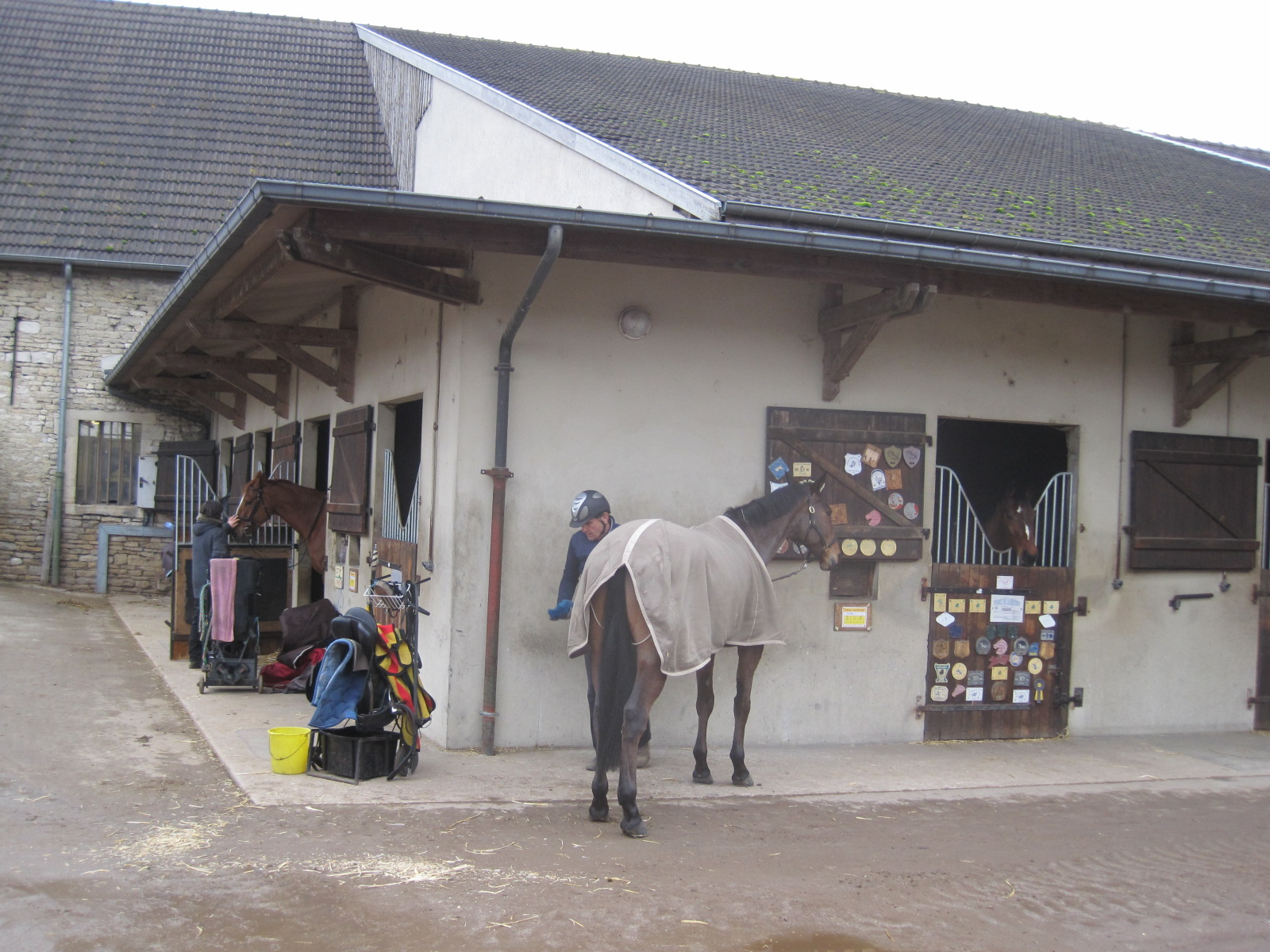
France's equestrian teaching model is based on riding schools, which have a strong presence throughout the country.

In 2013 the number of licensed riders fell for the first time, a phenomenon the FFE attributes to the economic crisis. At the end of the same year, an increase in VAT on equestrian activities is decided in France under François Hollande's government for January 2014. Dubbed Équitaxe or "Equi-tax", its implementation follows a series of conflicts between the French government and the European Union. On 22 October 2013, an amendment was proposed to the National Assembly to raise the VAT applicable to the equestrian sector by 13 points, from 7% to 20%. As soon as it became known, this amendment provoked strong reactions from the equestrian community. Equestrian events represent a "perhaps unprecedented event in French history".

A nationwide demonstration was organized on 24 November in response to a call from official bodies (Fédération française d'equitation, Fédération nationale du cheval, Groupement hippique national and FNSEA), and attracted thousands of demonstrators (5,000 according to the police prefecture, 15,000 to over 20,000 (and 1,000 ponies) according to the organizers). The law was implemented on 1 January 2014, then amended on 31 January, with the reintroduction of a reduced rate applicable to services for the use of sports facilities.

== Sociology ==
In 2011 according to a Sofres survey, 2.2 million French people regularly practiced equitation (2.3 million in 2013), and 14 million declared themselves ready to ride if the opportunity arose. It's an important factor in the relationship between town and country: urban riders regularly visit their riding school in the countryside, giving them a chance to discover the world of agriculture. Equitation is also France's third-largest sporting federation after soccer and tennis, and the leading women's sport (if non-Olympic women's sports are included, however, it comes sixth). Internationally, France is the second-largest contributor to the Fédération équestre internationale behind Germany, and its equestrian federation is the second-largest in the world. According to a BVA survey carried out in 2011, equestrianism enthusiasts in France are looking for closeness to nature, companionship with the horse and a connection with the rural world. 62% of those surveyed believe that the sport has been democratized. The typical French rider is a girl under the age of 16, and riders are generally children. In France, equestrianism has the (false) reputation of "not being a real sport", despite the considerable physical effort required in certain disciplines such as show jumping. Some riders are very old (or very young), and equestrianism has a strong leisure component, practiced mainly by little girls.

=== Feminization ===
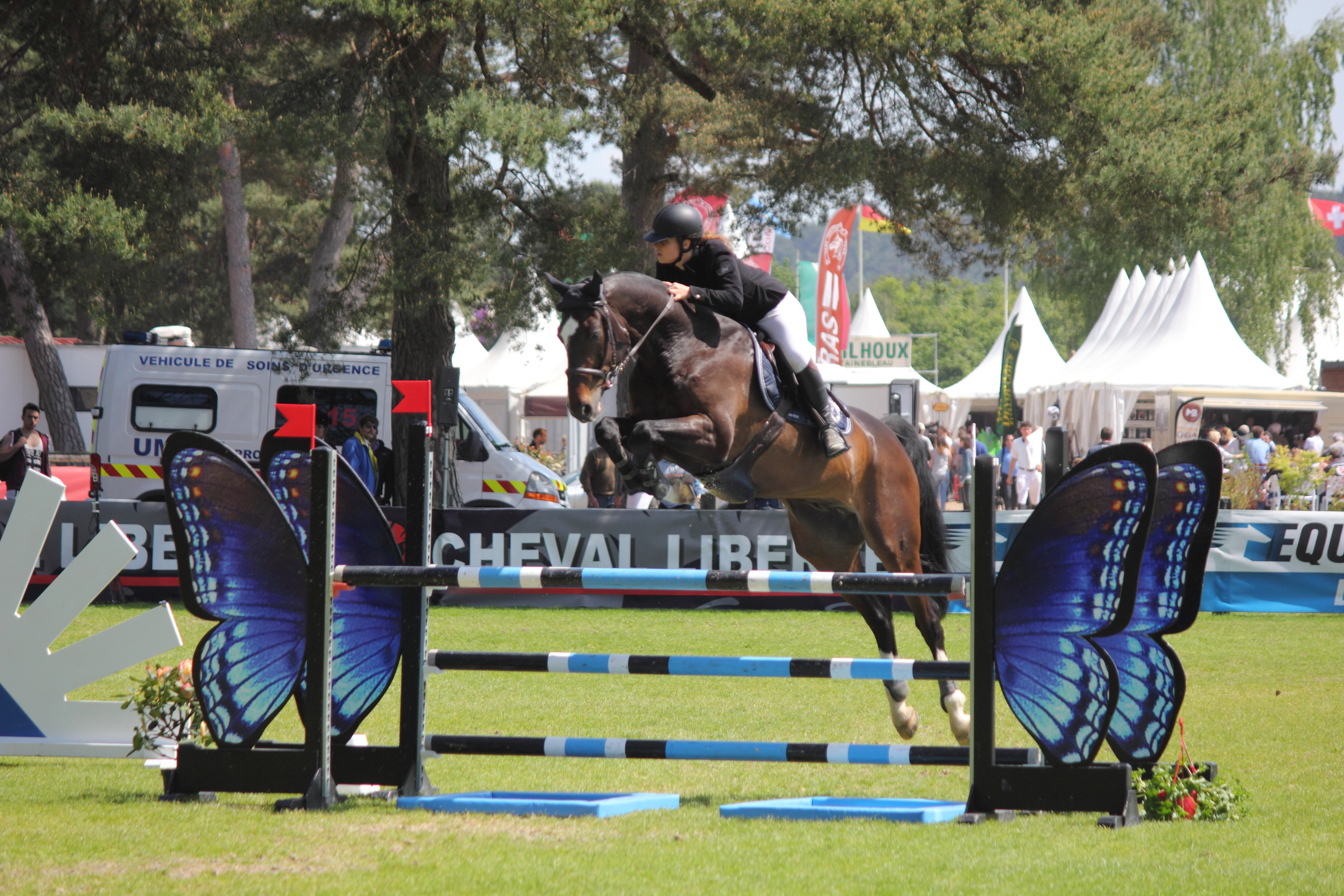
The vast majority of French riders are female.

The feminization of equestrianism is increasing, and the vast majority of riders in France are now women. At the beginning of the 21st century, they accounted for over 80% of licence holders. Historically, equestrianism was inaccessible to women, as French law prohibited them from riding astride until 1930. Until the 1970s, the equestrian world remained very masculine, as expressions like "horseman" attest. The majority of these riders are now students, who use their free time to look after horses. equestrian facilities are real gathering places for young girls on Wednesdays and weekends. The feminization of the French equestrian world is at odds with the masculine culture of the "horseman", and the exclusive pursuit of sporting performance. Jean-Pierre Digard notes that some female riders are driven by a desire for revenge or challenge in a milieu that has long remained masculine, while other specialists put forward psychoanalytical explanations for young girls' attraction to the horse. However, the majority of top-level riders are still men, since only 35% of "pro" riders are women.

=== Social background ===
Equestrianism is still perceived as a "rich man's sport". The development of certain equestrian sports based on the practices of wealthy English lords, such as hunting with hounds, may have remained anchored in French memory and contributed to this false image. Another possible explanation lies in the fact that many people mistakenly believe that it is necessary to own a horse to practice. But being a rider-owner is an expensive business. Serge Lecomte, President of the French Equitation Federation, points out that the average income of French equestrian families is between 25 and 35,000 euros a year, which is about the same as the average French person. According to the 2011 TNS Sofres survey, all socio-professional categories are represented, with 15% employees, 20% blue-collar workers, 22% intermediate professions and 23% senior executives. France Info qualifies this interpretation, since "15% of employees and 20% of blue-collar workers are less than the proportion of these categories in the French population". Similarly, senior executives are better represented (23%, compared with just over 15% in France). The median income of rider families is 2,300 euros per month, slightly higher than the national average. The majority of riders belong to the middle class.

Equitation is now much more accessible to the general public than in the past. In 2013, a non-owner rider spent around 1,100 euros a year on riding. A rider-owner spends around 2,600, three-quarters of which goes on maintaining the horse. The highest level remains relatively elitist due to the cost involved.

=== Dress codes ===
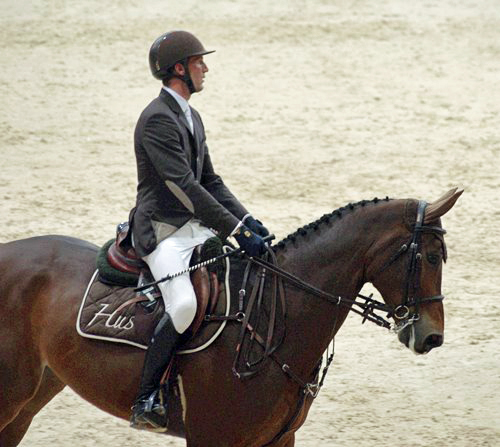
Kevin Staut wears the classic outfit for top-level French riders: bomb, boots, light pants and dark jacket.

For many French people, horse-riding remains a "distinguished" sport, with dress conventions (the "bombiste look") and ritualized behavior, giving it an "old France" and "upscale" reputation, according to ethnologist Jean-Pierre Digard. However, the dress code has evolved, as has the nature of the riders themselves. The clothing worn by riders in France reveals a mix of "old-fashioned and innovative". While bombs (or helmets) are still worn for safety reasons, classic riding breeches and boots are increasingly being replaced by chaps (the skin leggings cowboys wore over their pants), and gaiters or mini-chaps, worn over all types of footwear. This new dress code reflects Americanization, and a "cool", "natural" spirit.

== Economy ==
The real economic weight of the horse is difficult to determine: there are a multitude of activities around the horse, whose only common denominator is the animal itself. However, the economic importance of horse-riding has only grown stronger in the early 21st century. In 2010, the horse world as a whole (breeding and riding) represented over 75,000 FTE jobs, 55,000 companies and €12 billion in sales. In 2013, France boasted some 8,500 FFE-affiliated riding schools, representing 25,000 direct jobs (and 20,000 indirect jobs) linked to equestrian activities, making it the leading employer in the sport. Many jobs depend on the mere presence of horses on French soil: veterinarians, equine dentists and osteopaths, farriers, horse dealers, breeders and saddlers. Nearly a quarter of these jobs do not require riding skills, as they are held by grooms and groomsmen, France's leading equestrian profession. The second most important job is that of riding school instructor, and the third is that of training rider or lad-driver.

An hour's riding at an equestrian center costs between 15 and 20 euros (2013), and 58% of riders at French riding centers travel less than 13 km to reach the establishment where they practice. Any riding professional in France must "combine the qualities and skills of the equestrian with those of an efficient manager", but concern for teaching and aesthetics often outweighs that of remuneration. As a result, – and due to competition – most riding lessons are taught for less than they actually cost.

Another peculiarity of horse riding in France is the fact that the state and local authorities do not fund the structures or the practice. The cost of lessons is borne by the riders themselves. equestrian facilities are entirely paid for by their operators, which is the opposite of the situation in other sports practiced in France, such as soccer, athletics, swimming or judo, in which the State and local authorities invest by creating facilities (stadiums, sports halls, swimming pools, etc.). Horse-riding professionals wishing to teach or set up a structure can call on the help of numerous organizations throughout France, such as the Centre d'étude et de recherche sur l'économie et l'organisation des productions animales, the Groupement hippique national, the Institut du droit équin, the Syndicat national des exploitants d'établissements professionnels d'enseignement équestre, the Fédération interprofessionnelle du cheval de sport, de loisir et de travail, and even the CNRS, which regularly publishes studies on the equestrian environment. The French state has clearly withdrawn from equestrian activities, in particular the national stud farms.

Equestrian sport generates around €10 billion in annual revenues (2010) from betting, most of which goes to punters. 16% goes to industry professionals, with the remainder (€1.5 billion) going to the State. However, the French government opened up horse betting to competition in 2010, following a European decision. National investment in the equestrian sector comes from the Eperon fund ("Encouragement of regional or national equestrian projects"), set up in 2005 through a levy on earnings from the equestrian sports sector. In particular, it helped finance part of the 2014 World Equestrian Games. Since March 2011, the French government has also opened up show jumping and horse-ball to online betting. The horse industry plays an important role in France's equestrian economy: the sale price of aged or injured horses is often indexed to what slaughterhouses pay for meat.

== Disciplines and practices ==
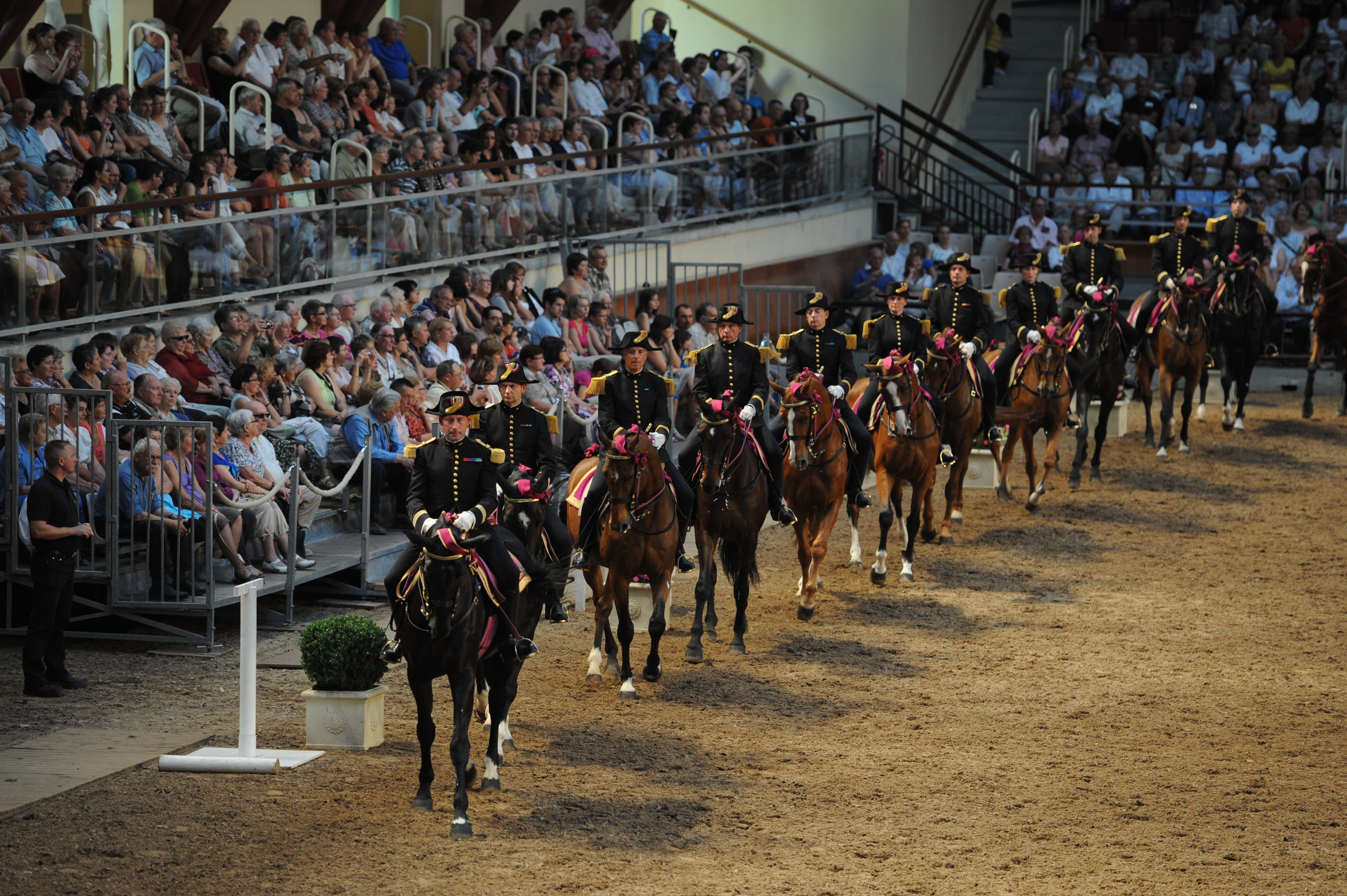
A revival of the Cadre Noir de Saumur, guardian of traditional French equestrianism

Since the end of the 20th century, horse-riding practices in France have been extremely diverse: Jean-Pierre Digard describes them as "baroque", "hedonistic" and "sentimental ", i.e. often stemming from foreign cultures, and focused on the pursuit of pleasure and closeness to the horse. Some are related to sport (equestrian sports), others to leisure or even play. Traditional equestrianism is a particular way of riding, linked to specific cultures. In France, equestrian sport, often mistaken for equestrian sport, is represented by trotting, galloping and show jumping. Hunter riding, a mix of dressage and show jumping, is one of the emerging disciplines, as are Equifun and Equifeel, which highlight the complicity, skill and maneuverability of the rider/horse pair.

=== Equestrian sports ===
Equestrian sports, as the name suggests, involve sporting performance by horse and rider. Show jumping remains the best-known and most widely practiced equestrian discipline in France. Along with dressage and eventing, it is also the most frequently taught, because of the sensations it provides for the rider.

Discipline	Presentation	Number of events	Numbers of participants
Combined driving	Competitions can be enjoyed by the whole family and include three events: dressage, handling and marathon. Combined driving is on the rise.		
Eventing	Three events: show jumping, dressage and cross-country.	6,000 (2011)	68,000 participants (2011)
Dressage	A competition involving the linking together of defined figures.	13,000 (2011)	68,500 participants (2011)
Endurance riding	Cross-country running in the great outdoors. Can also be practised (much more rarely) with a carriage.	2,800 races (2011)	20,500 participants (2011)
Horseball	Horse basketball, codified in 1979.	1,300 (2011)	350 teams and 16,000 participants (2011)
Para-equestrian	Two equestrian disciplines accessible to the disabled are organized in France: para-equestrian dressage and para-equestrian show jumping. Handisport equestrian competitions are run by the Fédération française handisport in conjunction with the Fédération française d'équitation.		
Team penning	Team cattle sorting. Managed by the French Working Equestrian Association.		
Polo	In teams, with a small ball and a mallet. Managed by the French Polo Federation.		954 members in 2010
Reining	Movements of ranch work in the arena. Managed by the National reining horse association of France.		400 members
Show jumping	Crossing a combination of moving obstacles.	More than 60,000 per year	More than a million participants every year.
Equestrian vaulting	Artistic figures on the horse's back. Officially recognized in 1985.	750 (2011)	3,800 (2011)

=== Equestrian sport ===
Equestrian sport has the particularity of being represented by two major disciplines of roughly equal importance: gallop (including steeplechase) and trotting (harnessed or mounted). Their origins are very different: unlike gallop racing, which was imported from England, trotting has its roots in local traditions, notably Norman half-blood racing. These two worlds have little or no communication with each other. The development of trotting racing is unique to France. This type of racing exists in other countries, but it is undoubtedly most prevalent in France. The horse-racing sector is experiencing a slight crisis throughout the West. Betting remains high, but racecourses are less and less frequented. In 2000, France had 263 racecourses in operation and 16,500 races organized.

=== Equestrian traditions ===
Discipline	Details
Hunting with hounds	Around 450 vénerie crews in France in 2013. The practice, banned in many other European countries, continues to be authorized despite the controversy it arouses. The best hunting horses compete in the French Hunting Horse Championship.
Doma vaquera	Working equestrianism practiced in Andalusia.
Camargue equitation	Working equitation specific to the Rhone delta. Practiced with a Camargue horse.
Traditional French equitation	Stemming from the heritage of French equestrians, and especially practiced at the Cadre Noir de Saumur.
Working equitation	Generic term for all equestrianism based on driving and sorting cattle.
Icelandic equestrianism	To be practiced with an Icelandic horse. Competitions and events organized by the Association Française d'Équitation Islandaise.
Portuguese equestrianism	To be practiced with a Lusitano horse.
Western riding	A generic term for sport or leisure riding based on American ranch work.
Amazon riding	equestrianism reserved for women, in dress and with both legs on the same side of the saddle.
Bajutsu	A variety of mounted combat techniques.

=== Hiking, leisure and games ===
France is also the world's leading destination for equestrian tourism: from 2003 to 2013, the number of equestrian tourists increased by 87%. One in two French people (surveyed) say they intend to take part in an equestrian activity on vacation, probably because they "want to be in contact with an animal they can't have at home". Children who take up horse-riding for the first time during their vacations often become regulars at riding schools the following year.

Discipline	Details
Equifeel	Equestrian game on foot, emphasizing complicity with the animal
Equifun	Equestrian game, a timed course with difficulties requiring maneuverability, jumping and skill. The difficulty of controlling the horse counts towards the final score
Mounted games	Various pony games. Developed in the 1990s.
Skijoring	Movement pulled by one or more equines, generally on snow. Historically, it enabled skiers to ascend the slopes before the arrival of ski lifts. Re-launched as a leisure sport in French ski resorts in the 1990s.
TREC (Techniques de Randonnée Équestre de Compétition)	A French discipline born at the end of the 1980s, which presents the difficulties of equestrian trekking in a competitive format. Can be practiced with a carriage.

=== Natural horsemanship ===
Robert Redford's hit film, The Horse Whisperer (1998), popularized American natural horsemanship in France. Within just a few years, the teachers of these methods had become renowned throughout Europe. Pat Parelli created the first ethological riding center in France, at the Haras de la Cense. Since the 2000s, the practice has been the subject of considerable interest.

== Famous French riders ==
Many French riders have reached the highest level in most FEI-recognized equestrian disciplines, notably show jumping, eventing and endurance. After the war, Pierre Jonquères d'Oriola (1920–2011) won numerous awards, making him France's best-known and most successful show jumper. In the 1980s, Pierre Durand's saga with Jappeloup also captured the imagination, culminating in a gold medal at the 1988 Olympic Games in Seoul. In 1990, Éric Navet became world show-jumping champion with Quito de Baussy. In 1996, Alexandra Ledermann won the bronze medal in Atlanta with Rochet M. and became the leading French show jumper. Michel Robert's career is also noteworthy, with an international equestrian career spanning over 40 years and numerous titles at world, European and Olympic championships. The good performances continue, with Roger-Yves Bost becoming European champion in the discipline in 2013.

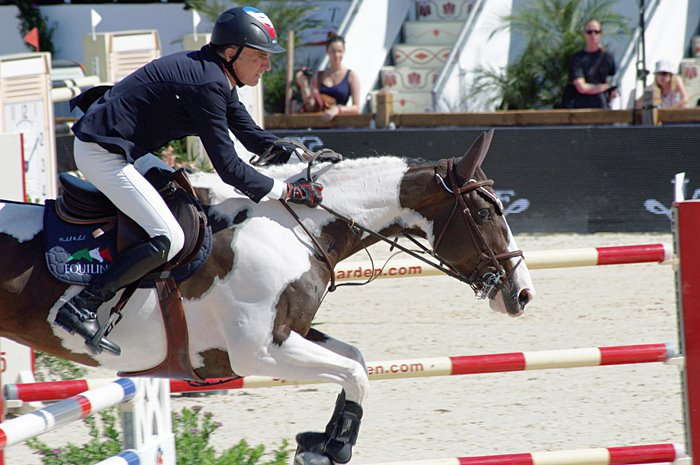
Michel Robert and Catapulte at the Global Champions Tour in Cannes in June 2012

French riders are less well represented in dressage, where the last Olympic medal was won by Franco-German Margit Otto-Crépin in 1988. In eventing, French riders regularly achieve good results on the international scene. However, these results must be qualified, as podium finishes are more frequent at European level than at world level. From the 1950s to the 1970s, French riders put in some excellent performances in this discipline. More recent performances by Jean Teulère, Marie-Christine Duroy, Didier Courrèges, Cédric Lyard, Arnaud Boiteau and Nicolas Touzaint have resulted in placings and victories at the 1994, 1998 and 2002 World Equestrian Games, as well as a team gold medal at the 2004 Athens Olympic Games. French endurance riders are among the best in the world. Virginie Atger has won several gold medals at European championships and World Equestrian Games. France is also the 2013 European champion nation in the discipline.

Numerous French celebrities regularly ride at various levels, including François Fabius, Guillaume Canet, Benjamin Castaldi and Nicolas Canteloup, who was a riding instructor before breaking through as a comedian. Since the beginning of the 20th century, equestrian shows have been associated with the great names of the French circus, such as the Bouglione family and later the Grüss family. France is still internationally renowned for its equestrian shows, with the Cadre Noir, Bartabas' troupe at the Académie du Spectacle Equestre, Mario Luraschi's troupe, the circus and the Musée Vivant du Cheval.

== Organization ==
=== Administrations and official bodies ===
The administrations and official bodies governing the equestrian world in France are numerous and complex, due to the nature of the animal itself, but also because of its wide variety of uses. From 1971 to 1990, equestrian activity was directly supervised by the Prime Minister through the Conseil Supérieur and the Comité Interministériel de l'equestrianism, which later became the Conseil Supérieur du Cheval, abolished in 1996. The Ministry of Agriculture oversees the French Horse and Riding Institute (IFCE), as well as horse racing and betting. Horse-riding is also part of the remit of the Ministry of Sports, Youth, Popular Education and Associative Life. As a result, the IFCE comes under the dual authority of these two ministries. The IFCE is a recent public establishment, having been created in 2010. Its mission is to promote equidae and horse-related activities, and to raise the profile of horse riding and the equestrian arts. In particular, it is responsible for defining training and assessment programs for equestrian disciplines, and participating in ongoing training. It also plays a support role for top-level athletes, providing them with suitable training facilities.

The French Equestrian Federation (FFE) is a national organization. Founded in 1987, it unites equestrian sports, equestrian tourism and pony riding, previously independent entities, under a single umbrella. The FFE's mission is to coordinate the activities of riding schools, select riders for competition, train judges, issue licenses and diplomas, and organize competition regulations in liaison with the FEI. It is not the only equestrian federation in France, as there are several independent federations. The Fédération française de polo is responsible for polo, the Fédération de dressage artistique for this emerging discipline, the Fédération des randonneurs équestres de France and Équiliberté de la randonnée, the Association française d'équitation de travail, for cattle-working disciplines originating in the United States. The policy pursued by the FFE has been criticized, in particular by Hervé Godignon, who has created the Mouvement pour les valeurs de l'équitation (MOVE) to oppose it.

Founded in 1865, the Société hippique française (SHF) aims to bring together, structure and develop the various efforts of those involved in the horse industry in terms of the production, development and marketing of young sport horses and ponies. It offers competition circuits by age group in the following six disciplines: show jumping, eventing, dressage, driving, endurance and hunter. The Groupement hippique national (GHN) is an association organized into regional delegations, which seeks to organize, inform and support entrepreneurs in the horse world in all their management activities. This organization brings together the vast majority of equestrian facilities and represents them in their dealings with public authorities. The Syndicat national des entreprises de tourisme équestre has the legal status of a trade union, and brings together a very high proportion of equestrian tourism center operators.

=== Equestrian facilities ===
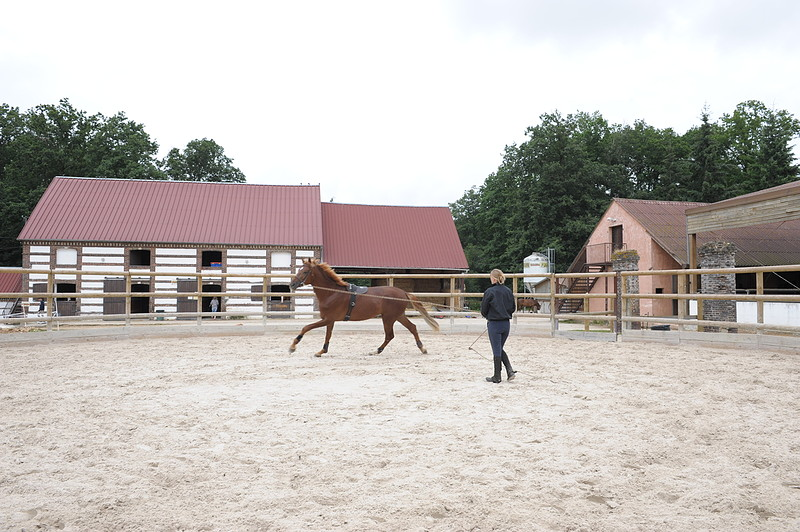
Lunging a horse at an equestrian facility

Equestrian facilities are France's main riding schools. The horse (or pony) used for instruction is shared by all. It does not belong to a particular owner, but to the riding school, which makes it available to all riders, even beginners. This French model is unique in Europe. In the space of twenty years, it has democratized the practice of horse riding, which in other countries remains a traditional or elitist activity.

All riding school instructors are required to hold a state-recognized diploma enabling them to teach for remuneration, while groomers and apprentices are not allowed to teach riding to the public. The organization of equestrian facilities also poses problems, as the number of structures has multiplied and they are encountering difficulties in terms of economics, respecting animal welfare and recruiting qualified employees.

=== Galops ===
The "Galops" are the FFE's federal riding exams in France. They are held under the aegis of the FFE, and have seven levels since 2012, after having nine for many years. As the majority of French riders are not professionals and don't have the time or opportunity to take all the Galops, it's rare to reach level seven. These exams are designed to assess a rider's level, and are akin to a "mini-competition". They include a theoretical part on hippology, as well as practical exercises and competitions. The first galops are assessed by a qualified riding instructor, while the highest galops are assessed by a commission.

== Events ==
There are many equestrian events on French soil, ranging from sporting competitions to shows and exhibitions.

=== Competitions ===
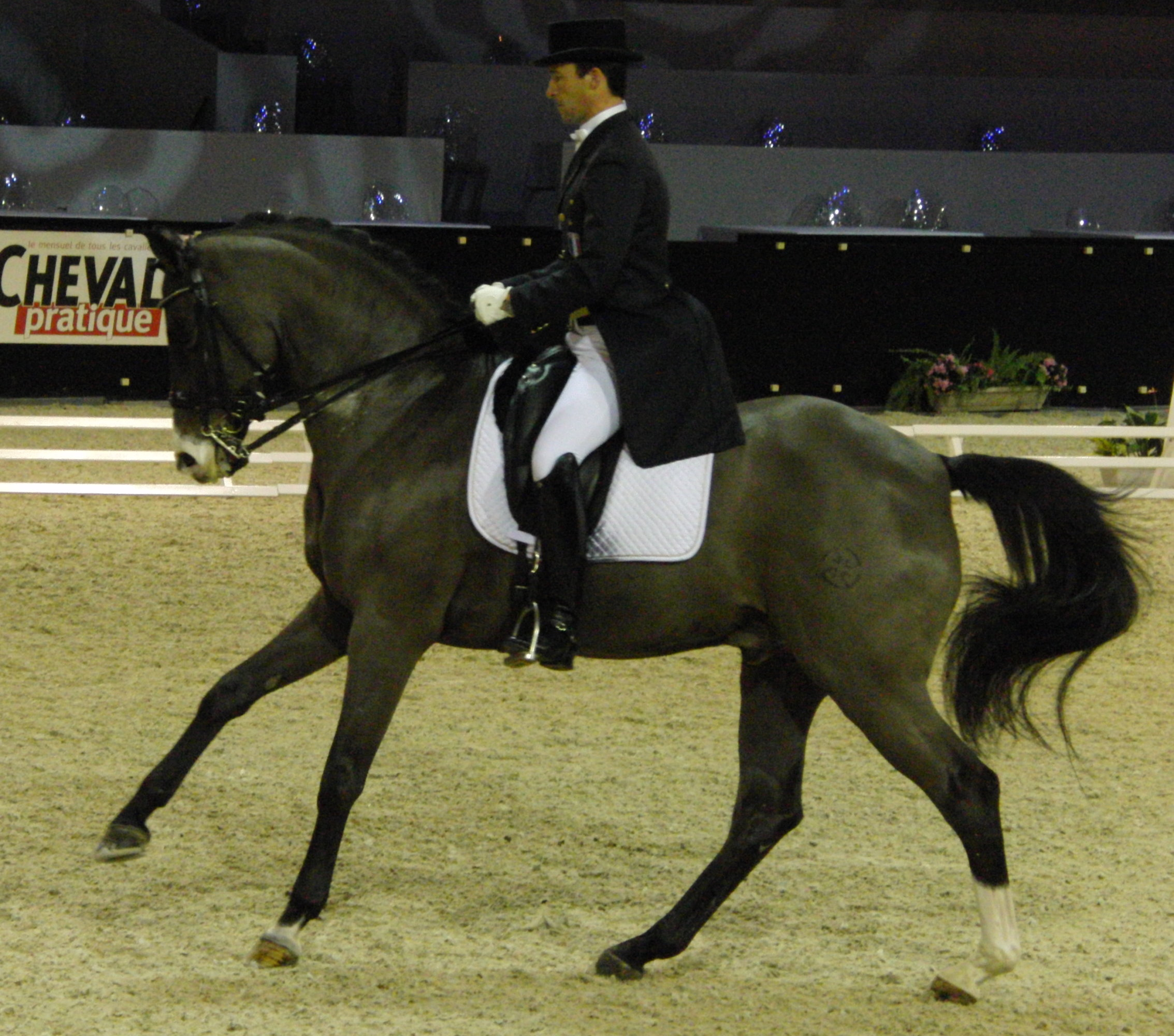
Marc Boblet at the Paris Cup Pro Elite dressage competition, Paris Horse Show 2009

In 2013, France was the world's leading organizer of equestrian sports competitions affiliated to the Fédération équestre internationale (FEI), with some 15,000 competitions across all disciplines and levels, attracting 8 million French people. They are considered "a factor in the development and animation of rural areas". However, only 22% of French riders (in 2013) take part in competitions. Competition levels range from pony competitions for children in their local clubs to professional circuits reserved for the world's elite. From the most accessible to the most difficult, there are Club (reserved for riders from riding schools), Amateur (generally for owner-riders) and Pro levels, itself divided into national and international. The professionals involved in French equestrian competitions, whether trainers, riders or judges, regularly work on an international level.

The FFE selects French riders to compete as part of the French team at major events such as the Olympic Games and the World Equestrian Games, in the eight disciplines recognized by the Fédération équestre internationale (CSO, CCE, dressage, reining, endurance, driving and para-equestrian dressage). Show jumping alone accounts for almost 80% of all competitions held in France. The five five-star French competitions in this discipline, known as the French Tour, include the Jumping International de France in La Baule, the World Cup stages in Lyon and Bordeaux, and the Global Champions Tour stages in Cannes and Chantilly. France also hosts the 2014 World Equestrian Games in Normandy, as well as a number of world-class competitions, including the Étoiles de Pau (four-star international eventing) and the Mondial du Lion (one- and two-star eventing, which counts towards the world ranking for six- and seven-year-old horses). The Générali Open de France has served as the French multi-discipline championship since 1994, particularly in show jumping. It attracts 500,000 visitors and over 13,000 riders, making it the world's biggest equestrian event, certified by the Guinness Book of Records. The Grande semaine de Fontainebleau is the national championship for young French sport horses.

The Grand National circuit, created in 2008, covers all three Olympic disciplines and is organized along Formula 1 lines: sponsored teams of two riders aim to accumulate maximum points.

=== Shows and events ===
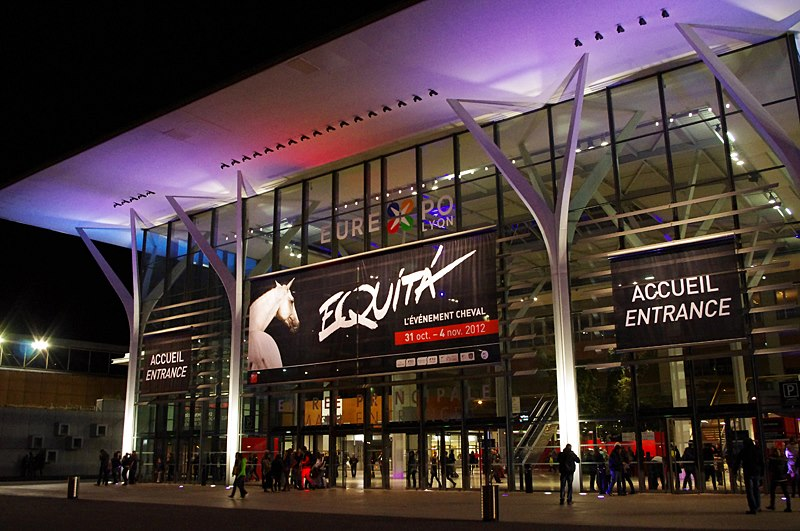
Eurexpo

At the end of 2009, fourteen annual trade shows in France were dedicated to horses and riding. Founded in 1972, the Salon du Cheval de Paris is the longest-running of these. On a single site, it enables visitors to meet breed associations, state bodies, regional associations and the various equestrian disciplines. Cheval Passion in Avignon is the leading equestrian show in the south of France. Since its creation in 1986, it has combined breed presentations and equestrian disciplines, while leaving plenty of room for horse shows. Equita'Lyon, France's most recent show, founded in 1995, features a wide range of competitions at all levels, a major western section and a night-time equestrian show. The Cadre Noir de Saumur regularly organizes presentations, and its July Carrousel, created in 1849, is the oldest military event in France, attracting over 8,000 spectators.

Several equestrian events are held throughout France. National Horse Day is, as its name suggests, a national event held every year for the general public. During the day, equestrian facilities open their doors to the public, offering events and introductions to horses and related activities. Many localities, often rural, organize a "horse festival" combining competitions, demonstrations, parades, farm presentations and shows: in Rambouillet, in Saint-Maur (Indre), in Burgundy in Nevers and Ciel, in Normandy in Forges-les-Eaux, in Vendée in Moutiers-les-Mauxfaits, in Auvergne in Dompierre-sur-Besbre, in Midi-Pyrénées in Monclar-de-Quercy, in Brittany in Guer and Landerneau, in Camargue in Saintes-Maries-de-la-Mer with the feria, or in the Alps in Val d'Allos. Equi'days is an initiative of the Conseil Général du Calvados. Since 1991, this event has brought together equestrian and equine activities over several days and at various sites in Normandy. Also in Lower Normandy, the Normandie Horse show is a major equestrian event held over several days. Created in 1987 and supported by the Conseil Général de la Manche, the event aims to promote French breeding through a variety of equestrian disciplines.

== Communication and media coverage ==
There is very little media coverage of equestrian sports, so few people are aware of the importance of the sport in France. The equestrian world has a reputation for being closed in on itself. According to Thierry Petitjean, president of the Calvados departmental horse-riding committee, "this is a very French problem", since in other European countries, such as Germany and England, horse-riding is much more widely represented in the media.

Ethnologist Jean-Pierre Digard suggests another reason: the gap between the professional riding world, still imbued with an ancient equestrian culture, and that of the new sport-leisure riders. The length and repetitiveness of events and the elitist image that persists (particularly in certain disciplines such as polo) are other possible reasons, as is the absence of media stars despite the potential of riders like Nicolas Touzaint. The general public often doesn't know who the champion riders are in the various disciplines, a knowledge made all the more difficult by the wide variety of equestrian sports practiced in France. General journalists generally don't have the knowledge to understand these different disciplines. What's more, official equestrian organizations (notably the French Equestrian Federation) make little use of the Internet and new technologies to communicate.

=== Television ===
Compared to other sports such as soccer, tennis, cycling or athletics, equestrian sports suffer from low exposure on generalist French TV channels and in non-specialized sports media. Riding has a small place in the French media, but equestrian sports do not. TF1 only devotes around 25 reports a year to equestrian sports, usually about children, nature, heritage or disability. France Télévisions considers it a minor sport, difficult to understand for the non-riding public. The only time equestrian sports are given visibility is when they win a medal at the Olympic Games, "if there is no other French medal on the same day".

On 9 September 1996, the France Courses channel was created to broadcast horse racing events and commentaries all day long. It was succeeded by Equidia on 20 October 1999, marking the arrival of France's first thematic channel dedicated to equestrianism and the horse world. On 20 September 2011, Equidia split into two channels: Equidia Live (for racing only) and Equidia Life (for all other equestrian domains). These two channels represent a major television medium, with over 10 million subscribers at the end of 2013. Equidia's audience consists mainly of punters and young riders. Equidia Life ceased broadcasting on 31 December 2017. Since the beginning of the 21st century, efforts have been made to improve the representation of equestrian sports on television. Eurosport has been broadcasting some major equestrian competitions since the 2010s (for a total of around sixty hours a year), and L'Équipe 21 has also been offering them since its creation in 2012. In 2008, the FFE launched its own free Internet channel, FFETv.

=== Press ===
Ouest-France, with its equestrian section created in 1985, is the only French general-interest newspaper that regularly publishes the results of equestrian sports competitions. The general press shuns riding. In the rare cases where it is given a prominent place, it's often because a public figure is involved. There are, however, a number of specialized equestrian press titles in France: Cheval magazine (generalist and for the general public), L'Éperon (competition and breeding, the oldest), Grand Prix magazine (competition, created in 2008), Cheval pratique (more technical), Cheval Savoir (more scientific and distributed online), Cheval Star (for children), Atout cheval (distributed in clubs), L'Écho des poneys and Cheval Arabe News (created in 2009, specializing in endurance and the Arabian horse).

=== Advertising ===
The FFE has created several TV campaigns on national French channels (notably TF1) to promote the sport, particularly among children and teenagers, using the children's slogan "Le cheval c'est trop génial" (Horses are so cool) over several years. This campaign received considerable media exposure and, according to an IFOP survey, attracted 2 million new children to the sport. PMU has also launched several press and TV campaigns: "a game like any other", "play with your emotions", and "we bet you'll win" (2013).

=== Sponsoring ===
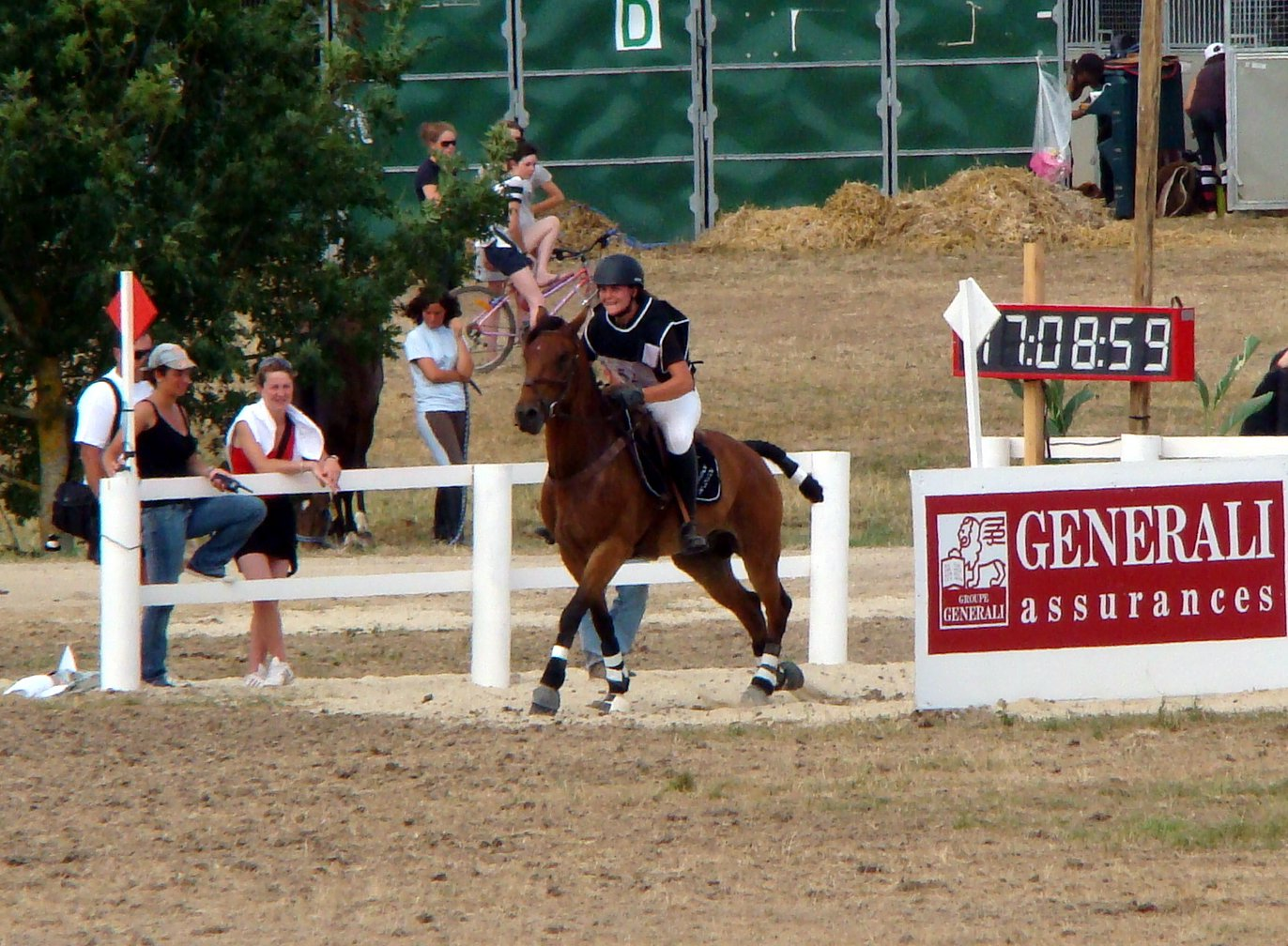
Eventing at the French Generali Open

The practice of sponsorship is fairly new to the French equestrian scene. Some riders found it hard to accept, but it's becoming more widespread. These sponsors do not always come from the equestrian world itself, with show jumping being sponsored by a construction company and a tour operator. Generali, which provides insurance for riders, has been sponsoring major FFE events since 1999, in particular the Generali Open de France. The World Cup circuit has been supported since its inception by a major automotive name. From 2007, a luxury watch brand became its main sponsor, before being replaced in January 2013 by a competitor. Major competitions anchored in a given region often benefit from the support of an economic player, such as a major regional daily newspaper and a news radio station for Jumping International de France. Two major events are naming events: Gucci returned after a 20-year absence to create the Gucci Masters in 2009, and Hermès International inaugurated the Saut Hermès at the Grand Palais in 2010. Both events are worldly and upscale. The Gucci Masters has gained a certain notoriety thanks to the Style & competition for AMADE event, sponsored by Charlotte Casiraghi: twelve duos, often featuring a well-known personality (Benjamin Castaldi, Nicolas Canteloup...), compete in disguise.

=== Cultural productions ===
Horse-riding is present in French cultural productions, whether in video games with Alexandra Ledermann's series, in cinema with films such as Jappeloup, Danse avec lui and Sport de filles, or on television. From the days of the RTF to the present day, French television has offered original creations around horses and riding: Poly in the 1960s and the youth series Le Ranch, broadcast since 2012, are examples. Writers such as Jérôme Garcin and Homéric have specialized in stories about horse riding. In comics, the Triple galop series created by Benoit Du Peloux (author), Alexandre Amouriq and Mirabelle has 9 volumes published by Bamboo.

== Criticism and controversy ==
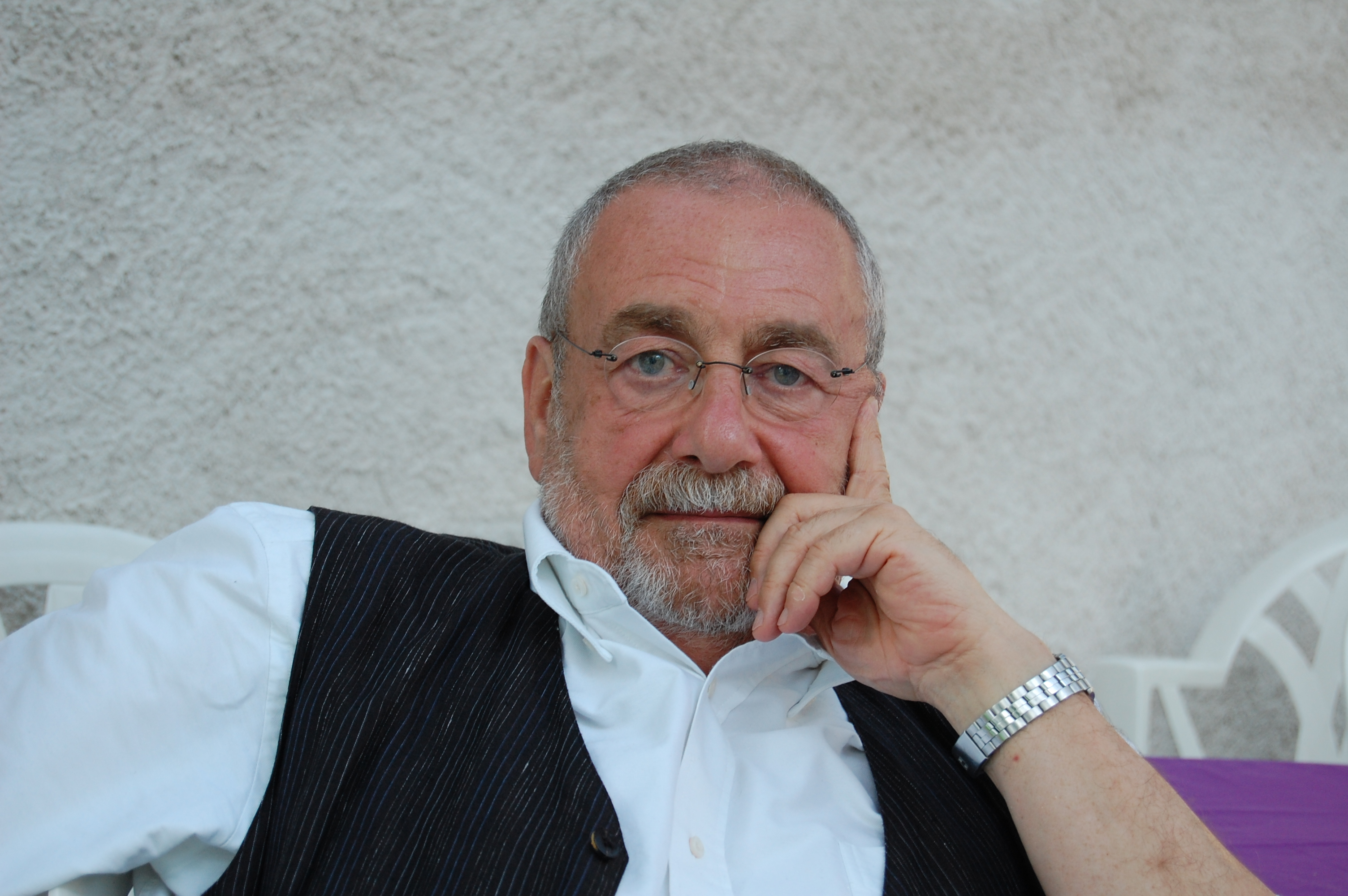
Jean-Pierre Digard, a horse ethnologist, has written several critical studies of the equestrian world in France.

The French equestrian world is also the subject of criticism. It's a fragmented, even divided milieu, which prevents a global defense while creating cleavages. This situation stems from the separate development of the various practices and the organizations that manage them. As a result, the racing, breeding, equestrian center, leisure riding and top-level sport sectors are not mutually supportive, a situation that Jean-Pierre Digard believes is accentuated by "the individualism and narcissism of riders ". This situation is perceptible through funding (the bulk of income comes from horse betting) and the absence of demonstrations in support of breeders when VAT on equine sales was raised in January 2013.

The FFE has often been criticized for its failure to regulate the location of riding schools in France, which has led to a decline in margins for each center due to competition, and a risk of market saturation. However, the FFE believes that it is impossible to regulate riding schools, as they are governed by commercial law. The quality of teaching in riding schools is often criticized by professional riders. It varies greatly from one club to another, and it is strongly recommended that riders attend classes several times before joining one, so as to be able to judge the competence of the instructors. Rider Kevin Staut also denounces the power of money in equestrian sports, with "rich kids" who don't know how to look after a horse, but who treat themselves to the best mounts. Conversely, in the world of equestrian sports, young people learn how to care for the animal before riding it.

Another controversy concerns animal welfare. The slaughter of horses and the marketing of their meat are highly unpopular with a majority of riders, and some movements (such as the Brigitte-Bardot Foundation) advocate their abolition. The Economic, Social and Environmental Council, however, considers that the disappearance of the horse-breeding industry would be "extremely damaging from an economic point of view for all the structures that make a living from racing and horse-riding", and is opposed to the acquisition of pet status for horses (supported by 64% of French people), arguing that this could eventually lead to a ban on horse-riding and racing, and that it is a question of responding to "a socio-economic reality". For Jean-Pierre Digard, the general public's access to horse-riding has had perverse effects in terms of the horse's economic survival, putting it at risk of disappearing in the future. Horse-riding is the subject of increasingly severe criticism (concerning the use of the riding crop, the danger of fixed obstacles, etc.). This phenomenon is reflected, among other things, in the craze for ethological horsemanship. The ethnologist believes that the horse could disappear if it were to be considered a pet, a status he tends to agree with in the French people's idea of it: "the 21st century will have to choose: return to a respectful but intensive use of horses, or resign ourselves to the extinction of the species". The disappearance of the horse in France seems highly unlikely, but horses would become rarer if riding were to be banned or considered a cruel practice.

== See also ==
- Horse breeding in France
- List of French horse breeds
- Global Champions Tour

== Bibliography ==
- Bernardini, Lola (October 2013), La médiatisation des jeux équestres mondiaux FEI Alltech 2014 en Normandie (PDF) (in French), archived from the original (PDF) on 27 May 2014
- Digard, Jean-Pierre (2004). Des manèges aux tipis. " Équitation éthologique " et mythes indiens (in French). Techniques et cultures. pp. 2–10.
- Digard, Jean-Pierre (2007). Une histoire du cheval : art, technique, société. Nature (in French). Actes Sud. p. 296. ISBN 978-2-7427-6483-9.
- Henriques Pereira, Carlos (2002). Marketing et management de l'équitation, suivi de Élevage et commercialisation du cheval de selle à la fin du xxe siècle (in French). Éditions L'Harmattan. p. 133. ISBN 2-7475-2173-7.
- Jussiau, Roland; Montméas, Louis; Parot, Jean-Claude (1999). "Aperçu de l'histoire de l'équitation en France". L'élevage en France 10 000 ans d'histoire (in French). Educagri Editions. p. 53. ISBN 2844440665.
- Lebrun, Jacky (2010). Les enjeux et les perspectives de la filière équine en France (PDF). Avis et rapports du conseil économique, social et environnemental de la république française.
- Michaud, Emmanuelle (May 2010). "Equito : Tout sur l'équitation et les médias" (PDF). Equito (in French) (1). Archived from the original (PDF) on 14 July 2014.
- Picout, Sabine (2013). Ce qu'il faut savoir sur le cheval et sur l'équitation pour être cavalier en France (in French). GRIN Verlag. p. 56. ISBN 978-3-656-15019-0.
- Racic-Hamitouche, Françoise; Ribaud, Sophie (2007). Cheval et équitation (in French). Editions Artemis. p. 287. ISBN 978-2-84416-468-1.* Sevestre, Jacques; Rosier, Nicole Agathe (1983). Le Cheval (in French). Larousse. ISBN 978-2-03-517118-4.
- Collectif (2011). Panorama Économique de la Filière Équine (in French). Le Pin-au-Haras, IFCE - les Haras nationaux. p. 241. ISBN 978-2-915250-19-0.
