= Jérôme Garcin =

French journalist and writer (born 1956)

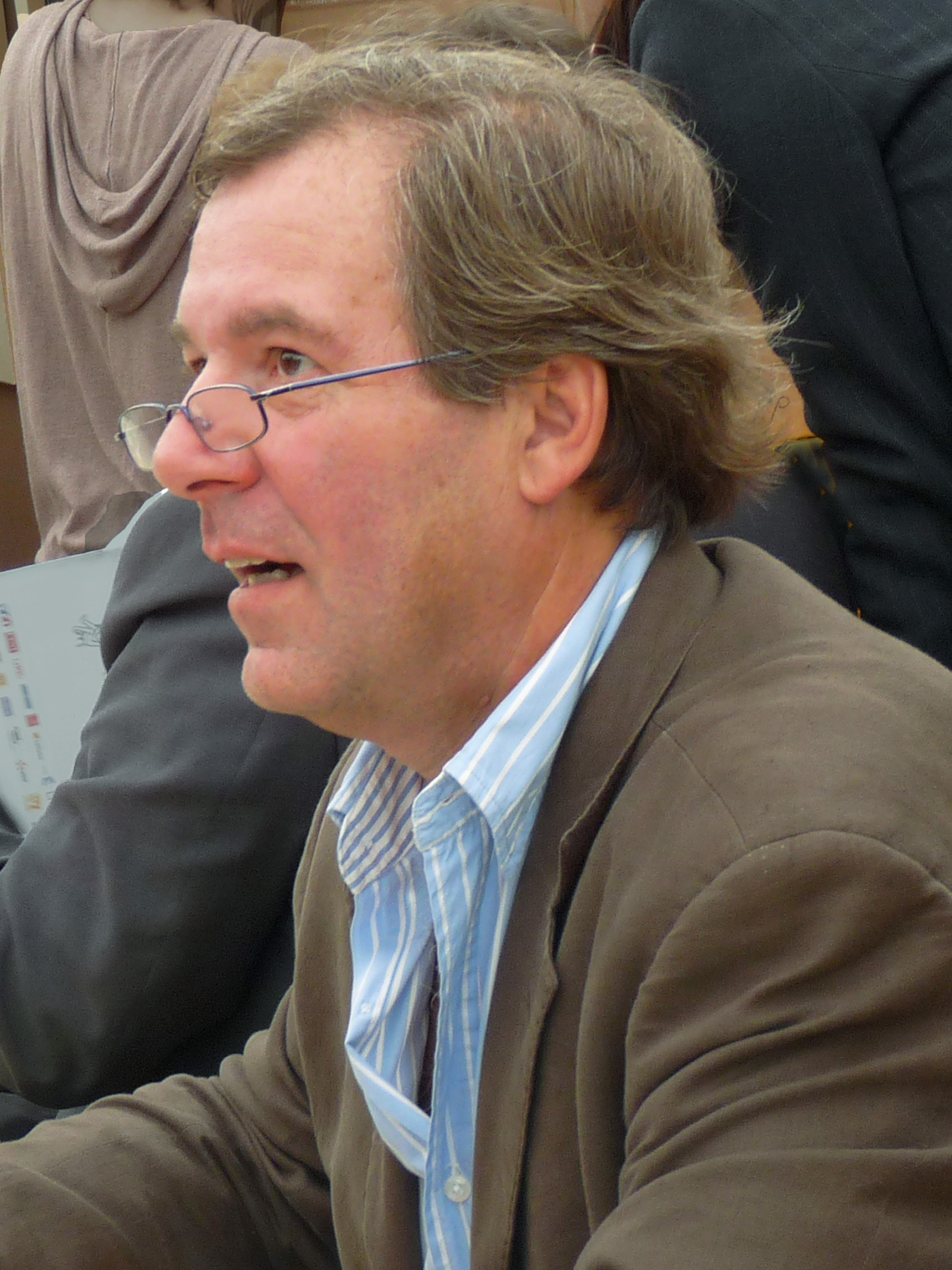
- Jérôme Garcin in 2011
- Born: 4 October 1956 (age 70); Paris, France
- Education: Lycée Henri-IV; Sorbonne
- Occupations: Writer; Journalist

Jérôme Garcin (born 4 October 1956) is a French journalist and writer. He heads the cultural section of the Nouvel Observateur, produces and hosts the radio programme Le Masque et la Plume on France Inter, and is a member of the reading committee of the Comédie-Française.

== Biography ==
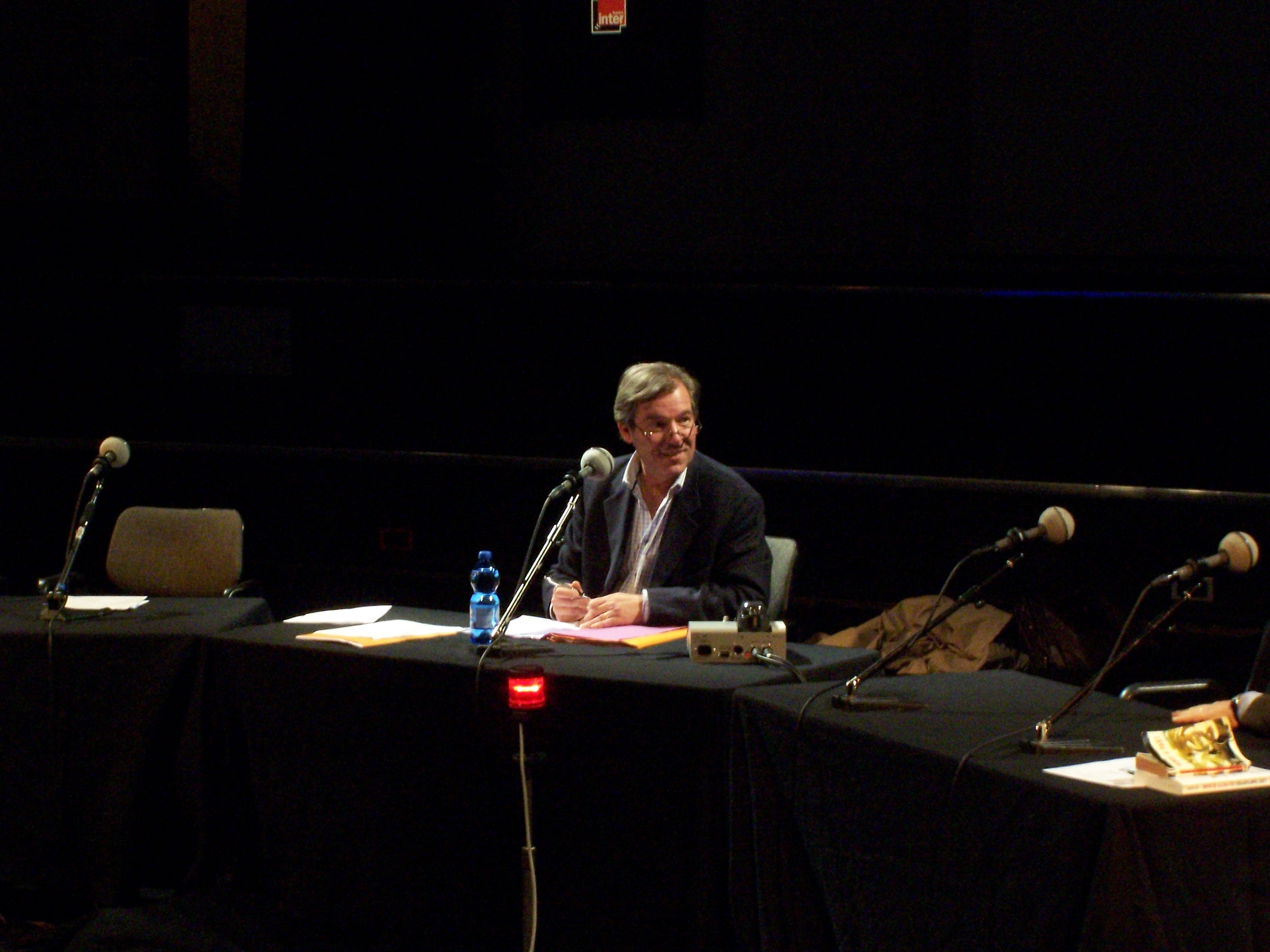
Jérôme Garcin in 2012 before the beginning of Le Masque et la Plume.

Jérôme Garcin was a pupil at the lycée Henri-IV in Paris before undertaking journalism studies. He then worked for the weekly L'Événement du jeudi. He published his first poems in the early eighties. In 1989, he succeeded Pierre Bouteiller to animate the show The Masque and the Plume of France Inter, of which he later became the producer. He also holds the position of deputy director of the weekly Le Nouvel Observateur and collaborates with the newspaper Service littéraire. A former member of the Prix Décembre, he was elected to the Prix Renaudot in March 2010 In the same year he was a member of the Prix Françoise Sagan.

In 1994, he received the prix Médicis essai for Pour Jean Prévost. The son of Philippe Garcin, an editor at the Presses universitaires de France, who died at the age of 45 as a result of a horse accident, he dedicate his first novel, La Chute de cheval to him, for which he was awarded the Prix Roger Nimier in 1998. When he was six, he accidentally lost his twin brother Olivier. He will dedicate him Olivier, a narrative published in 2011.

Garcin won the Grand Prix de littérature Henri-Gal of the Académie française in 2013 and the Prix Prince Pierre de Monaco in 2008.

He is married to actress Anne-Marie Philipe, the daughter of actor Gérard Philipe and Anne Philipe.

== Controversy ==
The website Acrimed suggested a conflict of interest between his profession of literary criticism, of animator producing the most prescriptive radio program in literary matter, and that of writer: the highly praising critics of Jérôme Garcin's works would not be alien to the dominant position he occupies in the French literary microcosm.

== Works ==
- 1994: Pour Jean Prévost, Gallimard ISBN 978-2070737024 – Prix Médicis essai 1994
- 1995: Littérature vagabonde, Flammarion
- 1998: La Chute de cheval, Gallimard – Prix Roger Nimier 1998, ISBN 2-07-075204-6
- 1999: Barbara, claire de nuit, La Martinière Groupe, ISBN 2-07-041909-6
- 2001: C'était tous les jours tempête, Gallimard, ISBN 978-2070756896 – Hérault de Séchelles's imagined confessions
- 2003: Théâtre intime – Prix France Télévisions essai 2003
- 2004: Bartabas (novel), éd. Gallimard ISBN 978-2070744282 – biographie romancée sur l'écuyer Bartabas; Prix Jean-Freustié

== 2005: Le Masque et la Plume with Daniel Garcia, anthology of the program ==
- 2006: Cavalier seul: journal équestre, Gallimard
- 2007: Les Sœurs de Prague, Gallimard,
- 2007: Nouvelles Mythologies (collective work under his direction, and writing of the text Le Corps nu d'Emmanuelle Béart), éditions du Seuil
- 2008: Son excellence, monsieur mon ami, Gallimard ISBN 978-2070783885 – Prix Duménil 2008
- 2009: Les livres ont un visage, Mercure de France
- 2010: L'Écuyer mirobolant, Gallimard, ISBN 978-2070121823
- 2011: Olivier, éd. Gallimard ISBN 978-2070131631
- 2012: Fraternité secrète in collaboration with Jacques Chessex, éditions Grasset, ISBN 978-2246783534
- 2013: Bleus horizons, Gallimard – Prix des romancières 2014 ISBN 978-2-07-013061-0
- 2014: Le Voyant, Gallimard – biography of blind resistant Jacques Lusseyran – prix Nice Baie des Anges 2015 – Prix Relay des Voyageurs Lecteurs 2015 – Prix d’une vie
- 2015: Nos dimanches soirs, co-éd. Grasset/France-Inter – Le Masque et la Plume et son histoire

== See also ==
- Étienne Beudant's life inspired L'Écuyer mirobolant, Gallimard.
