= Catapulte =

Show jumping Dutch mare

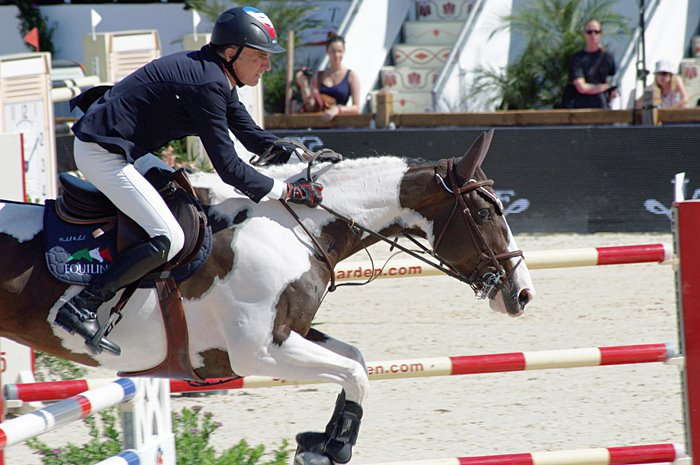
- Breed: Belgian sport horse
- Sire: Limbo
- Dam: Mumarilla
- Sex: Female
- Country: Saint-Pierre-les-Étieux, France
- Color: Pinto
- Owner: Michel Robert, Olivier Robert

Catapulte (born on May 5, 2002, in Saint-Pierre-les-Étieux, Cher, France) is a pinto-bay show jumping mare of Dutch origin, registered in the Belgian Sport Horse studbook (SBS). French rider Michel Robert acquired Catapulte in 2007, following her first foaling, to train her in show jumping. In 2012 and 2013, Catapulte won numerous prizes, but she never reached Grand Prix level. Despite this, she gained fame and a dedicated fan club.

Her popularity owes much to her rare coat color for top-level sport horses and her unique character. Robert describes her as a mare with a strong personality, easier to manage over jumps than on the flat, and extremely endearing. The rider retired from the sport and sold her at the end of 2013. After a brief stay at the Belgian Ashford Farms stables, Frenchman Olivier Robert rode Catapulte in 2014 and 2015. Officially retired in February 2016, she now serves as a broodmare.

== History ==
Catapulte was born on May 5, 2002, at Chrystel Ribe's breeding farm, Petit Chaillou, in Saint-Pierre-les-Étieux, Cher. Ribe specialized in colored show jumper horses. The mare foaled at age four in 2006, and Robert purchased her the following year. She received an electronic transponder on January 4, 2008.

Robert decided to train her after witnessing her free jump an obstacle "too big for her age." Despite starting late in show jumping, Catapulte quickly ascended the ranks. In 2012, she triumphed in several speed competitions, including the Prix France Bleu at the CSI5* in Bordeaux, and the Grand Prix GL Events at the Saut Hermès in March 2012, jumping heights from 1.45 m to 1.50 m. These victories in Paris significantly boosted Robert’s profile, especially since he had not won at the Grand Palais even with his Grand Prix mare, Kellemoi de Pepita. Catapulte garnered attention throughout the season and built a substantial fan club, thanks to her assertive character and unique appearance. She has a Facebook page and was featured with Robert on the poster for the 2014 edition of the Hermès jump.

Robert announced his retirement from sport and competition at the end of 2013, along with his intention to sell Catapulte. She joined the Belgian stables Ashford Farms, where initially Marlon Zanotelli was to ride her. However, in November 2013, Belgian Pieter Clemens rode her for a few months, before her transfer on April 30, 2014, to French rider Olivier Robert (no relation to Michel Robert).

The mare officially retired to Olivier in February 2016, at the age of 15.

== Description ==
Catapulte has a distinctive appearance with a pinto-bay coat and a partly white eye, similar to some American colored horses, often leading to her being mistaken for an American mare. Her pinto-bay coat is exceedingly rare among top-level sport horses. She stands at 17 hands, or 1.72 m. Robert considers her an excellent mare, highly technical and efficient, who is eager to perform well. She has a strong character but is gentle at heart, creating deep bonds, especially with her groom. Robert notes her great sporting qualities, attributing them to her physique and jumping ability, as she arches well over obstacles. However, she occasionally has poor balance and needs to extend more. Working with her on the flat can be challenging, though she enjoys jumping. Robert adds that she performs best when she chooses to.

== Achievements ==
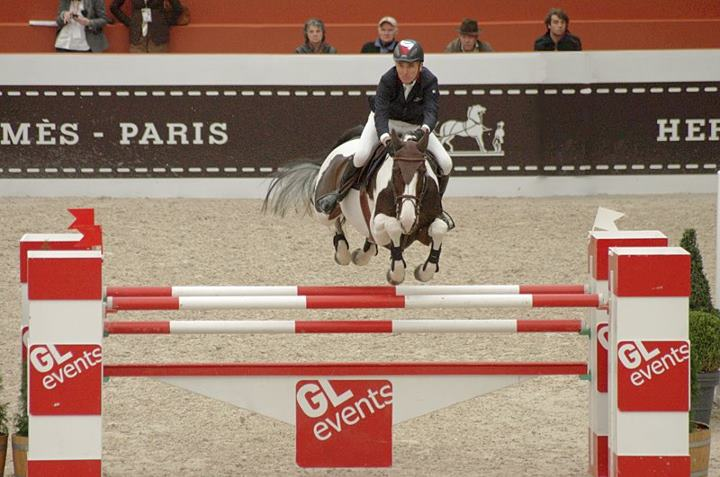
Michel Robert and Catapulte at Saut Hermès in 2012

From 2008 to 2015, Catapulte amassed over €130,000 in winnings from French show jumping events, including €79,000 in 2012 alone. She achieved her highest performance index in 2013, with an ISO (Show Jumping Index) of 168.

=== 2012 ===
- February: Won the Prix France Bleu at the Jumping International de Bordeaux at 1.45 m.
- March: Won the GL Events Prize at the 2012 Saut Hermès, a speed competition.
- June: Competed in the CSI3* at Saint-Lô, a 1.35 m speed competition.
- July: Placed 2nd in the Global Champions Tour in Monaco, a 1.45 m speed competition.
- December: Won the Prix Le Figaro at the Gucci Paris Masters 2012, a 1.45 m speed competition.
- December: Competed in the CSI5* in A Coruña, at 1.45 m.

=== 2013 ===
- February: Won the Prix Foire Internationale de Bordeaux at Bordeaux International Jumping, a 1.40 m speed competition.
- June: Placed 1st at the CSI4* Bourg-en-Bresse, a 1.40 m speed competition.

=== 2014 ===
Between June 2013 and April 2014, Clemens rode Catapulte in competitions from 1.35 m to 1.40 m. Olivier began riding her in 2014, initially in modest competitions.

- January: Competed in the Oliva CSI2*, at 1.35 m.
- May: Competed in the Grands Prix Pro 2 and Pro 3 at Cap Ferret, at 1.25 m and 1.30 m.
- May: Placed 5th in the CSI4* Bourg-en-Bresse, at 1.45 m.

=== 2015 ===
- May: Finished 2nd in the Grand Prix Pro 2 de Gradignan, at 1.35 m.
- Her last registered competition was a CSI3*W in Rabat, Morocco, where she finished 13th.

== Pedigree ==
Catapulte's pedigree is predominantly Dutch Warmblood, but her breeder chose to register her in the Belgian Sport Horse studbook.

Pedigree of Catapulte
Sire Limbo (1993)	Concorde (1984-2014)	Voltaire (1979-2004)	Furioso II (1965-1986)
Sire Limbo (1993)	Concorde (1984-2014)	Voltaire (1979-2004)	Gogo (1975)
Sire Limbo (1993)	Concorde (1984-2014)	Flyer (1969)	Marco Polo (1962)
Sire Limbo (1993)	Concorde (1984-2014)	Flyer (1969)	Klaske (1960)
Sire Limbo (1993)	Hira (1989)	Rivaal (1975)	Persian Path S (1966)
Sire Limbo (1993)	Hira (1989)	Rivaal (1975)	Mireille Sijgje (1971)
Sire Limbo (1993)	Hira (1989)	Bira (1983)	Samber (1976)
Sire Limbo (1993)	Hira (1989)	Bira (1983)	Vira (1979)
Dam Mumarilla (1994-2017)	Fedor (1987)	Darco (1980-2006)	Lugano van La Roche (1963)
Dam Mumarilla (1994-2017)	Fedor (1987)	Darco (1980-2006)	Ocoucha (1968)
Dam Mumarilla (1994-2017)	Fedor (1987)	Harmonieuse (1973)	Adagio (1966)
Dam Mumarilla (1994-2017)	Fedor (1987)	Harmonieuse (1973)	Salamine (1962)
Dam Mumarilla (1994-2017)	Humarilla (1989)	Belmondo (1983)	Omega (1973)
Dam Mumarilla (1994-2017)	Humarilla (1989)	Belmondo (1983)	Rolande (1975)
Dam Mumarilla (1994-2017)	Humarilla (1989)	Amarilla (1982)	Wahtamin (1969)
Dam Mumarilla (1994-2017)	Humarilla (1989)	Amarilla (1982)	Pumarilla (1974)

== Breeding ==
In 2006, Catapulte foaled, giving birth to a bay male named Super Krack, sired by the French Selle stallion Madness, also owned by Ribe. The stallion was approved for breeding in the Selle Français studbook. In 2015, Catapulte was inseminated by Cornet Obolensky and underwent an embryo transfer to a surrogate mare. She was inseminated again in 2017 by Kannan, resulting in the birth of the foal Indhu Madhi in 2018. Finally, in 2020, she gave birth to a pinto-bay foal sired by Chacfly PS, named Kiss Kiss Bang Bang.

== See also ==
- Belgian Sport Horse
- Pinto horse
- Michel Robert
