= List of race horse trainers =

Race horse trainers train horses for horse racing. This involves exercising, feeding, management and, in early years, to get them used to human contact.

Once a horse is old enough to be ridden, a trainer prepares a horse for races, with responsibility for exercising it, getting it race-ready by designing exercise routines tailored for each horse and its needs as well as determining which races it should enter. Leading horse trainers can earn a great deal of money from a percentage of the winnings that they charge the owner for training the horse. They typically collect 10% of the purse money won by the horses they are currently training.

Outside horse racing, most trainers specialize in a certain equestrianism discipline. Some fields can be very lucrative, usually depending on the value of the horses one trains or prize money available in competition.

== Race horse trainers by country ==
=== Australia ===
- Rod Bonella
- Scobie Breasley
- Fred Castledine
- Bart Cummings
- Etienne L. de Mestre
- Jack Denham
- Isaac Earnshaw
- Greg Eurell
- Seth Ferry
- Lee Freedman
- Cecil Godby
- Sol Green
- Theodore Green
- David Hall
- George Hanlon
- John Hawkes
- Colin Hayes
- David A. Hayes
- Robert Hickmott
- Jack Holt
- Sampson Hosking
- Bob Hoysted
- Pat Hyland
- Sheila Laxon
- Ciaron Maher
- Kerryn Manning
- Bob Maumill
- John F. Meagher
- Denis Pagan
- Brett Sutton
- Gai Waterhouse
- Kim Waugh
- Tommy Woodcock

=== Argentina ===
- Francisco Maschio
- Angel Penna Sr.

=== Barbados ===
- William C. Marshall
- Michael Stoute
- Edward Walcott Junior
- Elizabeth Deane

=== Canada ===
- Sid C. Attard
- Roger Attfield
- Reade Baker
- Macdonald Benson
- James C. Bentley
- Gary Boulanger
- Charles Boyle
- William H. Bringloe
- Josie Carroll
- Lou Cavalaris Jr.
- Reggie Cornell
- David C. Cross Jr.
- Robert T. Davies
- Jim Day
- William Donohue
- Mark Frostad
- Harry Giddings Jr.
- Lucien Laurin
- Roger Laurin
- Les Lear
- Barry Littlefield
- Jerry C. Meyer
- Gordon J. McCann
- Barbara J. Minshall
- Eva Ring
- Rayel Robinson
- William Robinson (Horse trainer)
- Gil Rowntree
- Laurie Silvera
- Yonnie Starr
- Robert Tiller
- Daniel Vella
- Francine Villeneuve

=== Cuba ===
- Laz Barrera

=== France ===
- Pascal Bary
- Patrick Biancone
- François Boutin
- Georges Bridgland
- Robert Collet
- François Doumen
- Camille du Gast
- William B. Duke
- André Fabre
- Raymond Gruppi
- John Hammond
- Criquette Head-Maarek
- Alec Head
- Freddy Head
- Éric Legrix
- Élie Lellouche
- François Mathet
- Markus Münch
- Jean-Claude Rouget
- Alain de Royer-Dupré
- Bernard Secly
- Charles Semblat
- Nash Turner
- Jimmy Winkfield
- Maurice Zilber

=== Germany ===
- Johannes Frömming
- Heinz Jentzsch
- Charlie Mills
- Peter Schiergen
- Andreas Schütz
- Andreas Suborics

=== Hong Kong ===
- Derek Cruz
- Tony Cruz
- David Ferraris
- David Hall
- Brian Kan
- Almond Lee
- Andy T. W. Leung
- Frankie Lor
- Manfred K. L. Man
- John Moore
- Gary T. K. Ng
- Peter B. K. Ng
- Paul O'Sullivan
- Andreas Schütz
- John Size
- Sean Woods
- Dennis C. H. Yip
- Ricky P. F. Yiu

=== India ===
- Rashid Byramji
- Pesi Shroff

=== Ireland ===
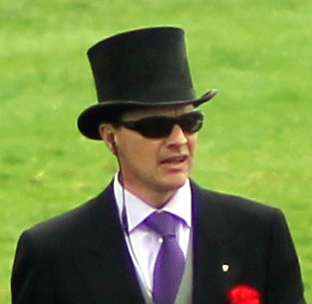
Aidan O'Brien

- Jim Bolger
- Cecil Boyd-Rochfort
- Neville Callaghan
- Peter Casey
- Noel Chance
- Denny Cordell
- Barney Curley
- Richard Dawson
- Henry de Bromhead
- Tom Dreaper
- Pat Eddery
- Gordon Elliott
- Richard Fahey
- Francis Flood
- Patrick J. Flynn
- Tom Foley
- Jessica Harrington
- Eoin G. Harty
- Paul Hennessy
- Dessie Hughes
- Richard Hughes
- Kevin Kerr
- Sheila Lavery
- Adrian Maguire
- Noel Meade
- Brian Meehan
- Mouse Morris
- Emmet Mullins
- Paddy Mullins
- Willie Mullins
- Johnny Murtagh
- Aidan O'Brien
- Donnacha O'Brien
- Fergal O'Brien
- Joseph Patrick O'Brien
- Phonsie O'Brien
- Vincent O'Brien
- Edward O'Grady
- Jonjo O'Neill
- Joseph Osborne
- Mick O'Toole
- John Oxx
- James Parkinson
- Paddy Prendergast
- Christy Roche
- Fergie Sutherland
- Charlie Swan
- Pat Taaffe
- Tom Taaffe
- David Wachman
- Michael G. Walsh
- Ted Walsh
- Dermot Weld

=== Italy ===
- Antonio Balzarini
- Marco Botti
- Luca Cumani
- Giordano Ruffo
- Federico Tesio

=== Japan ===
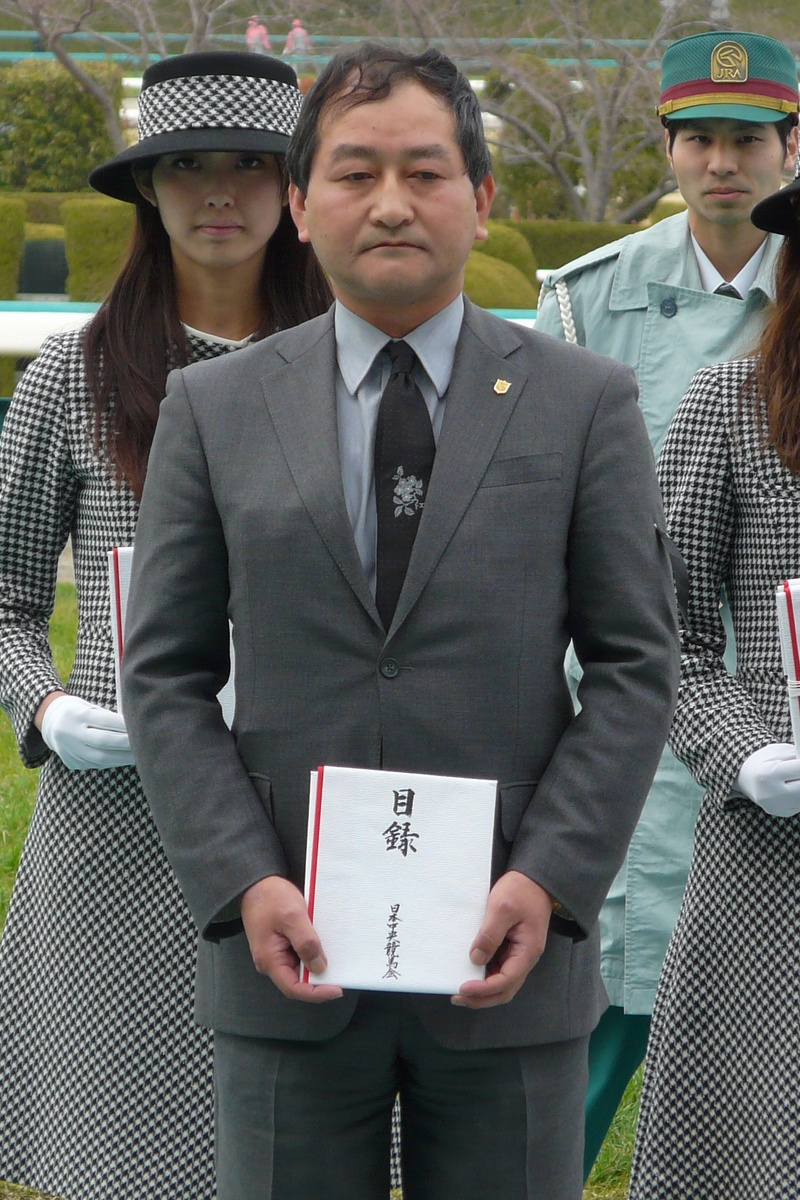
Yoshito Yahagi

- Masayoshi Ebina
- Kazuo Fujisawa
- Yuichi Fukunaga
- Tetsuya Kimura
- Dai Muneishi
- Hirofumi Shii
- Yūichi Shikato
- Naosuke Sugai
- Haruki Sugiyama
- Katsuhiko Sumii
- Koshiro Take
- Yasuo Tomomichi
- Ryuji Wada
- Yoshito Yahagi

=== New Zealand ===
- Tony Allan
- Murray Baker
- Cecil Devine
- Bill Hazlett
- Tony Herlihy
- Charlie Hunter
- Free Holmes
- Roger James
- Colin Jillings
- Linda Jones
- Laurie Laxon
- Sheila Laxon
- Hedwick Wilhelmina McDonald
- Trevor McKee
- Michael Moroney
- Denis Nyhan
- Mark Purdon
- Roy Purdon
- Natalie Rasmussen
- Steven Reid
- Dave O'Sullivan
- Lance O'Sullivan
- Paul O'Sullivan
- Jamie Richards
- Graeme Rogerson
- Doody Townley
- Chris Waller

=== Norway ===
- Terje Dahl
- Kjell Håkonsen
- Arnfinn Lund

=== Singapore ===
- Garnet Bougoure

=== South Africa ===
- David Ferraris
- Terrance Millard

=== United Arab Emirates ===
- Saeed bin Suroor
- Mahmood Al Zarooni

=== United Kingdom ===
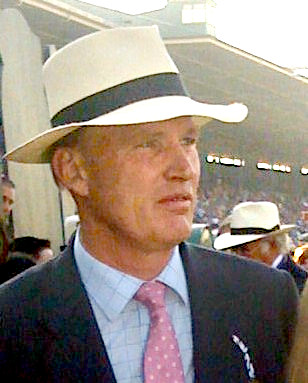
John Gosden

- Neil Adam
- Ivan Allan
- Robert Alner
- Jack Anthony
- Charlie Appleby
- Robert Armstrong
- Andrew Balding
- Ian Balding
- Ivor G. Balding
- Toby Balding
- David Barons
- Frederick Whitfield Barrett
- Peter Beaumont
- Ralph Beckett
- George Beeby
- Michael Bell
- Basil Blackett
- George Blackwell
- Herbert Blagrave
- William Blenkiron
- Milton Bradley
- Mark Brisbourne
- Clive Brittain
- Peter Bromley
- Charlie Brooks
- Tim Brookshaw
- Arthur Budgett
- Frank Butters
- Simon Callaghan
- Julie Camacho
- Roy Cambidge
- Henry Candy
- Tom Cannon Sr.
- Peter Cazalet
- Henry Cecil
- Mick Channon
- Jane Chapple-Hyam
- Peter Chapple-Hyam
- Roger Charlton
- Stanley Clarke
- Paul Cole
- Robert Cowell
- Jim Culloty
- Luca Cumani
- Len Cundell
- Fred Darling
- Sam Darling
- Tom Dascombe
- Zoe Davison
- George Dawson
- Mathew Dawson
- John Day
- John Barham Day
- William Day
- Michael Dickinson
- Louie Dingwall
- George Dockeray
- Simon Dow
- Neil D. Drysdale
- George Duller
- Ed Dunlop
- John Dunlop
- Bill Dutton
- Walter Earl
- Mick Easterby
- Peter Easterby
- Tim Easterby
- Edward Ede
- George Edwards
- Eric Eldin
- Bill Elsey
- Charles Elsey
- David Elsworth
- James Fanshawe
- Lord John FitzGerald
- John Forth
- Tim Forster
- Tregonwell Frampton
- Arthur Freeman
- Harry Fry
- Josh Gifford
- Peter Gilpin
- John G. Goldsmith
- Steve Gollings
- John Gosden
- Thady Gosden
- Towser Gosden
- Chris Green
- Brian Gubby
- William Haggas
- John Hammond
- Richard Hannon Jr.
- Richard Hannon Sr.
- Peter Harris
- Guy Harwood
- Patrick Haslam
- Peter Hastings-Bass
- Alfred Hayhoe
- Richard Head, 2nd Viscount Head
- Peter Hedger
- Nicky Henderson
- Dick Hern
- Anne Cowdrey, 14th Lady Herries of Terregles
- Edward Hide
- Barry Hills
- John Hills
- Jeremy Hindley
- Bruce Hobbs
- Philip Hobbs
- Gavin Hunter
- William Hastings-Bass, 17th Earl of Huntingdon
- Jack Jarvis
- Michael Jarvis
- Malcolm Jefferson
- Fulke Johnson Houghton
- Helen Johnson Houghton
- Mark Johnston
- Harry Thomson Jones
- James Kasparoff
- Gay Kindersley
- Alan King
- Henrietta Knight
- George Lambton
- Joseph Lawson
- Francis Lee
- Geoff Lewis
- Morgan Lindsay
- Carl Llewellyn
- David Loder
- Len Lungo
- William Macdonald
- James Octavius Machell
- Beryl Markham
- Marcus Marsh
- Richard Marsh
- William C. Marshall
- Ginger McCain
- Charles McVittie
- Stan Mellor
- Marcus Milner
- Hughie Morrison
- Charles Morton
- Noel Murless
- Florence Nagle
- Richard Newland
- David Nicholls
- Paul Nicholls
- David Nicholson
- Frenchie Nicholson
- Walter Nightingall
- Peter Niven
- Jeremy Noseda
- Ken Oliver
- Tom Olliver
- Jack Ormston
- Jamie Osborne
- Jonathan Pease
- Charles Peck
- Amanda Perrett
- Atty Persse
- Lester Piggott
- David Pipe
- Martin Pipe
- Jenny Pitman
- John Porter
- Mark Prescott
- Ryan Price
- Micky Quinn
- Andrew Reid
- Mary Reveley
- Gordon W. Richards
- Nicky Richards
- John Maunsell Richardson
- Fred Rimell
- Jack Robinson
- Robert Robson
- Richard Rowe
- Lucinda Russell
- Mick Ryan
- Alex Scott
- John Scott
- Michael Scudamore
- Oliver Sherwood
- Robert Sherwood
- Bob Sievier
- Dan Skelton
- Denys Smith
- Sue Smith
- Matt Stephenson
- Michael Stoute
- Alan Swinbank
- Walter Swinburn
- Alec Taylor Jr.
- Alec Taylor Sr.
- Colin Tizzard
- Mark Tompkins
- Jeremy Tree
- Marcus Tregoning
- Nigel Twiston-Davies
- Bernard van Cutsem
- Roger Varian
- Richard Vernon
- Tom Walls
- Fulke Walwyn
- Peter Walwyn
- James Waugh
- Vere Fane, 14th Earl of Westmorland
- Venetia Williams
- Norah Wilmot
- Fred Winter
- Richard Woollacott
- Geoff Wragg
- Harry Wragg

=== United States ===
- Whitey Abel
- Smiley Adams
- Paul T. Adwell
- Thomas Albertrani
- Frank A. Alexander
- Hank Allen
- Jena Antonucci
- Fernando Alvarez
- Thomas M. Amoss
- Clinton Anderson
- Pete D. Anderson
- Steve Asmussen
- Ivor G. Balding
- Kaye Bell
- Bob Baffert
- Dale Baird
- Robert L. Baird
- Laz Barrera
- Thomas J. Barry
- Caroll K. Bassett
- H. Guy Bedwell
- Jesse Beery
- Macdonald Benson
- Elizabeth Williams Berry
- Patrick Biancone
- Sylvia Rideoutt Bishop
- Scott Blasi
- Lew Bloom
- Thomas Bohannan
- Pete Bostwick
- James E. Bracken
- Buck Brannaman
- Kelly J. Breen
- Donna Barton Brothers
- Frank L. Brothers
- Chad Brown
- Edward D. Brown
- Preston M. Burch
- William P. Burch
- Fred Burlew
- Merritt C. Buxton
- J. Dallett Byers
- Patrick B. Byrne
- W. Bret Calhoun
- Robert W. Camac
- Craig Cameron
- Gregory Duncan Cameron
- Hardy Campbell Jr.
- John P. Campo
- Del W. Carroll
- Henry L. Carroll
- Mark E. Casse
- Wayne M. Catalano
- Frank Catrone
- Lou Cavalaris Jr.
- Alice Headley Chandler
- Brendon Clark
- Henry S. Clark
- William R. Claypool
- Christophe Clement
- Edward A. Christmas
- Junior Coffey
- Jimmy Combest
- Don Combs
- Gary C. Contessa
- George H. Conway
- James P. Conway
- Edward C. Corrigan
- Brad H. Cox
- Chris Cox
- Jimmy Croll
- David C. Cross Jr.
- Hilton Dabson
- J. Keith Desormeaux
- Laura de Seroux
- Cherie DeVaux
- Patrick B. Devereux Sr.
- John Dickerson
- Stephen A. DiMauro
- Stephen L. DiMauro
- Douglas Dodson
- Samuel Doggett
- Wallace Dollase
- William Donohue
- A. Thomas Doyle
- William B. Duke
- Wally Dunn
- Richard E. Dutrow Sr.
- Tony Dutrow
- Ronald W. Ellis
- David Erb
- Jerry M. Fanning
- William B. Finnegan
- William H. Fires
- James E. Fitzsimmons
- William H. Fizer
- Hugh L. Fontaine
- Mark Ford
- Henry Forrest
- Willard C. Freeman
- David A. Gall
- William M. Garth
- John M. Gaver Jr.
- Loyd Gentry Jr.
- Stanley I. Gold
- Alan E. Goldberg
- J. Paco Gonzalez
- Edwin J. Gregson
- Richard E. Handlen
- Carl Hanford
- Scott Harlan
- Eoin G. Harty
- Billy Haughton
- Casey Hayes
- Eddie Hayward
- Bruce Headley
- T. J. Healey
- Dan L. Hendricks
- Mark A. Hennig
- John O. Hertler
- Sam Hildreth
- Sonny Hine
- William J. Hirsch
- Thomas Hitchcock Sr.
- David Hofmans
- Jerry Hollendorfer
- Robert E. Holthus
- Stanley M. Hough
- Lindsay C. Howard
- Neil J. Howard
- Jim Hudson
- Hollie Hughes
- William A. Hurley
- Tim Ice
- Barry Irwin
- Eugene Jacobs
- Hirsch Jacobs
- Silas Jayne
- Lawrence W. Jennings
- H. Allen Jerkens
- Jimmy Jerkens
- Albert Johnson (jockey)
- Philip G. Johnson (horseman)
- Moody Jolley
- LeRoy Jolley
- Ben A. Jones
- Gary F. Jones
- Horace A. Jones
- J. Larry Jones
- Walter A. Kelley
- Thomas Joseph Kelly
- Ralph Kercheval
- John C. Kimmel
- Scott A. Lake
- Chick Lang
- Lucien Laurin
- Roger Laurin
- John J. Lenzini Jr.
- Budd Lepman
- Bruce N. Levine
- Barry Littlefield
- Johnny Longden
- Vance Longden
- Charles LoPresti
- D. Wayne Lukas
- Sarah A. Lundy
- Horatio Luro
- Guy J. Lyon
- John Lyons
- John E. Madden
- Michael J. Maker
- James W. Maloney
- Richard E. Mandella
- Steve Margolis
- Pancho Martin
- Jose A. Martin
- Brian Mayberry
- Ron McAnally
- Frank McCabe
- Michael W. McCarthy
- Thomas R. McCarthy
- Byron McClelland
- Conn McCreary
- Robert V. McGarvey
- Shug McGaughey
- Kiaran McLaughlin
- Kenneth McPeek
- Jerry C. Meyer
- Bert S. Michell
- David Miller
- MacKenzie Miller
- Peter Miller
- Richard O. Miller
- William Molter
- J. D. Mooney
- Henry M. Moreno
- Jim Morgan (basketball)
- H. Graham Motion
- William I. Mott
- Winbert F. Mulholland
- Jeff Mullins
- Carl Nafzger
- Jim Nazworthy
- Edward A. Neloy
- John A. Nerud
- Victor J. Nickerson
- Joe Notter
- Niall M. O'Callaghan
- George M. Odom
- Doug O'Neill
- Joe Orseno
- Homer C. Pardue
- John Parisella
- Burley E. Parke
- Ivan H. Parke
- William L. Passmore
- Charles T. Patterson
- Charles Peoples
- Benjamin W. Perkins Jr.
- Daniel Perlsweig
- Abraham Perry
- Maurice Peters
- Clyde Phillips
- Joseph H. Pierce Jr.
- Helen Pitts
- Jimmy Pitt
- Edward Plesa Jr.
- Todd Pletcher
- Ernie T. Poulos
- Thomas F. Proctor
- Virgil W. Raines
- Rodney Rash
- Eric Reed
- Linda L. Rice
- Katherine Ritvo
- Timothy F. Ritchey
- Jay M. Robbins
- Craig G. Roberts
- Carl A. Roles
- Walter C. Rollins
- Dale Romans
- Haskell Ross
- Louie J. Roussel III
- James G. Rowe Jr.
- James G. Rowe Sr.
- Gail Ruffu
- John Russell
- Sol Rutchick
- James E. Ryan
- John W. Sadler
- Jamie Sanders
- Louis Schaefer
- Ray Schnittker
- Flint S. Schulhofer
- Andy Schuttinger
- Gary Sciacca
- Woodrow Sedlacek
- Jason Servis
- John Servis
- Jonathan E. Sheppard
- Art Sherman
- John Shirreffs
- Bill Shoemaker
- Richard Small
- James W. Smith
- Robert Augustus Smith
- Evert V. Snedecker
- J. Bert Sonnier
- Albert Stall Jr.
- William Ward Stephens
- Woody Stephens
- Dallas Stewart
- Joseph H. Stotler
- Melvin F. Stute
- Warren Stute
- Barclay Tagg
- Jimmy Takter
- Frank M. Taylor
- J. Thomas Taylor
- Mesh Tenney
- Howard M. Tesher
- Herbert J. Thompson
- J. Willard Thompson
- Noble Threewitt
- Vincent Timphony
- Gwyn R. Tompkins
- James J. Toner
- Harry Trotsek
- Clyde Troutt
- Robert Tucker
- Clyde Turk
- Billy Turner
- Jack Van Berg
- Clyde Van Dusen
- David R. Vance
- Harvey L. Vanier
- John M. Veitch
- Sylvester Veitch
- Donnie K. Von Hemel
- R. Wyndham Walden
- W. Elliott Walden
- Roy Waldron
- Billy Walker
- George Walsh
- John T. Ward Jr.
- Wesley A. Ward
- Frank D. Weir
- Buster Welch
- Stacy Westfall
- Robert L. Wheeler
- Oscar White
- David A. Whiteley
- Lynn S. Whiting
- Charles E. Whittingham
- Ian Wilkes
- Moe Williams
- Ansel Williamson
- G. Carey Winfrey
- Jimmy Winkfield
- Martin D. Wolfson
- Bennie L. Woolley Jr.
- Frank I. Wright
- Vester R. Wright
- Edward J. Yowell
- Frederick Hinde Zimmerman
- Nick Zito

According to The American Racing Manual, the thoroughbred horse racing trainers who have led the annual money-earning list more than twice since 1908 are:

- D. Wayne Lukas (14)
- Sam Hildreth (9)
- Charlie Whittingham (7)
- Sunny Jim Fitzsimmons, Horace A. Jones (5)
- Bob Baffert, Laz Barrera, Ben A. Jones, William Molter (4)
- Hirsch Jacobs, Edward A. Neloy, James G. Rowe Sr. (3)

== See also ==
- Horse training
- Horse racing
