= The Horse Whisperer =

A horse whisperer is a term for some practitioners of natural horsemanship.

Horse Whisperer or The Horse Whisperer may also refer to:

== In media ==
- The Horse Whisperer (novel) (1995), a novel by Nicholas Evans
- The Horse Whisperer (film) (1998), a film based on the novel, directed by and starring Robert Redford

== In people ==
A number of people are referred to as "the horse whisperer" or "a horse whisperer":

- John Solomon Rarey (1827–1866), American horse trainer summoned by Queen Victoria to use his technique on "most ferocious horse in all England"
- Buck Brannaman (born 1962), named by Nicholas Evans as the primary inspiration for his book The Horse Whisperer
- Monty Roberts (born 1935), American horse trainer and subject of a BBC/PBS documentary The Real Horse Whisperer
- Daniel "Horse-Whisperer" Sullivan (died 1810), an Irish horse trainer
