= Groveport United Methodist Church =

- U.S. National Register of Historic Places
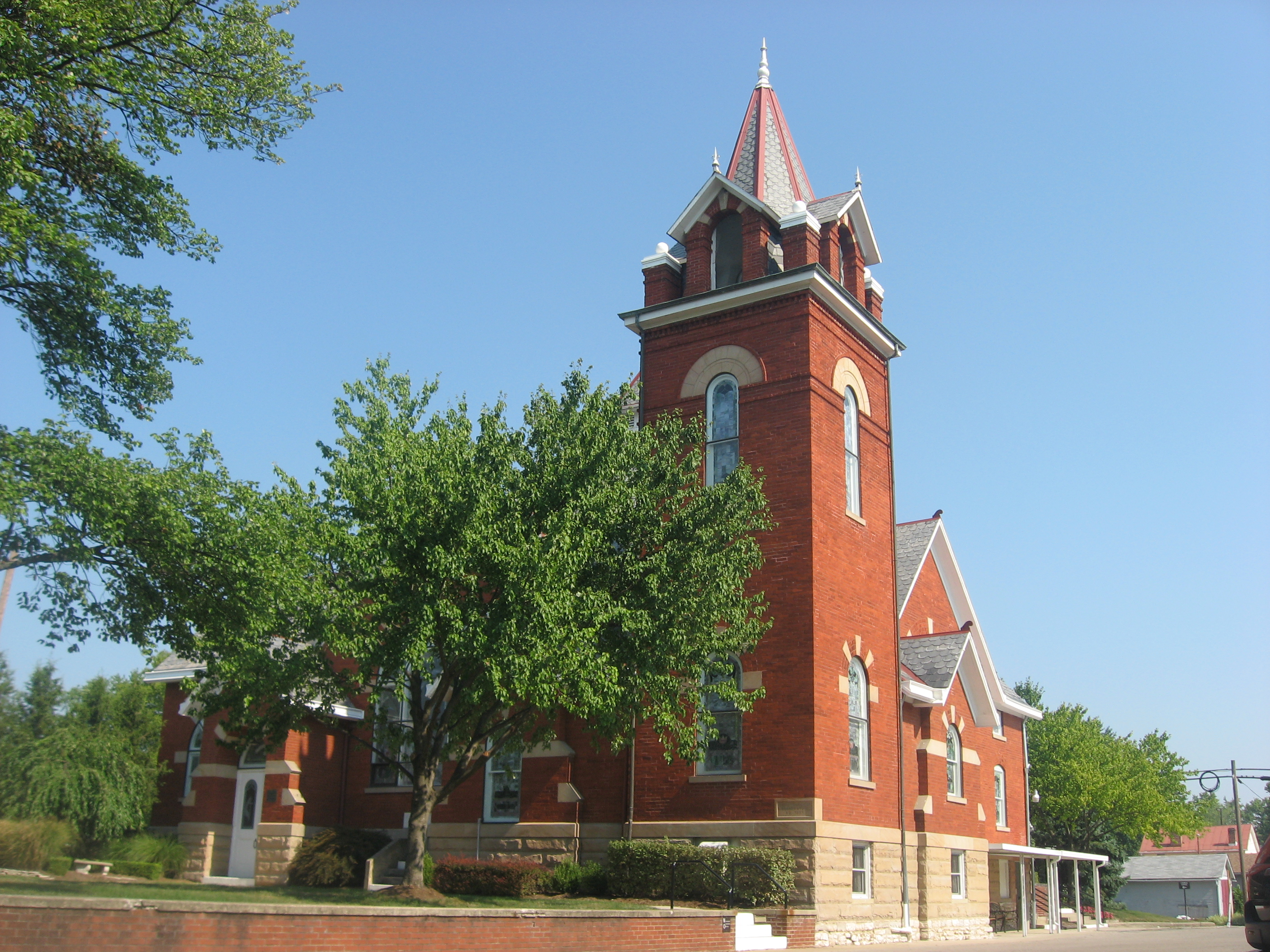
- Front and eastern side

- Location within Ohio Location within the United States
- Location: 512 Main St., Groveport, Ohio
- Coordinates: 39°51′7″N 82°53′9″W
- Area: Less than 1 acre (0.40 ha)
- Built: 1907
- Architect: Charles Rarey
- Architectural style: Gothic Revival
- NRHP reference No.: 95000494
- Added to NRHP: April 20, 1995

Groveport United Methodist Church is a historic church in the city of Groveport, Ohio, United States. Established in the 1830s, this congregation of the United Methodist Church worships in an early twentieth-century building that has been named a historic site.

Hopewell Methodist Episcopal Church was founded in present-day Madison Township, Franklin County in 1805, as perhaps the first church in the township, and Asbury Methodist Episcopal Church was formed in the same township in the following year. Some members of these two congregations living in the vicinity of present-day Groveport founded the Groveport Methodist Church in 1836, and the first church building was completed by the end of the year, using bricks made on site. The name "Groveport" was not yet in existence, it having been picked as a compromise between two competing names in early 1847. In 1839, it became the center of a new circuit, and Methodists became numerous enough in Groveport that their house of worship was incapable of accommodating the worshippers by 1851. As a result, a second church building was constructed; the members subscribed more than $4,200, although some subscribers' failure to pay forced delays in the construction process.

The second church building remained the home of the congregation until 1908, in which year the third and present building was completed. Construction was overseen by Charles Rarey, who ultimately resigned his position as a Franklin County court clerk in order to participate full-time in the construction process. The structure cost $25,000 to build, and like its predecessor, its bricks were made within Groveport.

Groveport Methodist Church is a brick building with a foundation of limestone, a slate roof, and substantial areas of glass. A tower sits on the corner, topped with a steep peaked roof, while the rooflines of the rest of the building are generally gabled. Rounded-arch windows and doorways are placed in numerous locations on the exterior, including two on separate stories of the tower. These windows, composed of stained glass, are among the building's most distinctive elements.

Groveport remains an active part of the United Methodist Church, within the Olentangy River District of the denomination's West Ohio Conference. In 1995, the building itself gained recognition as it was listed on the National Register of Historic Places because of its historically significant architecture. It is one of four Groveport locations on the National Register, along with the Groveport Log Houses, the Groveport School, and a cluster of buildings known as the Groveport Town Hall Historic Group.
