= Parelli Natural Horsemanship =

Parelli Natural Horsemanship (also known as Parelli or PNH) is a program of natural horsemanship, founded in 1981 by Pat Parelli. The program is headquartered in Pagosa Springs, Colorado.

== Program ==
Parelli Natural Horsemanship states its core principle as "Horsemanship can be obtained naturally through communication, understanding and psychology, versus mechanics, fear and intimidation." Parelli's methods were first publicized by Robert M. Miller in a series of articles in Western Horseman magazine in 1983 and 1984. In 1993, Parelli published his first book, Natural Horse-Man-Ship, co-authored by Kathy Kadash Swan and with photography by Parelli's first wife, Karen. (Note: Kathy Kadash Swan is credited differently in various editions; e.g. and in Parelli, Pat; Swan, Kathy; Parelli, Karen (1993). Natural horse-man-ship (2004 ed.). Colorado Springs, CO: Western Horseman. ISBN 9781585747122.) The Parelli program is now promoted as co-founded by Parelli and his second wife, Linda.

The Parelli program is offered through courses in Colorado and Florida, and includes a four-part training program of horsemanship referred to as "The Four Savvys". The exercises developed by Parelli that emulate these behaviors are referred to as the "Seven Games". The "Parelli Natural Horsemanship University" was approved as a "private occupational school" by the Colorado Department of Higher Education in 2003. It is listed under the state's Division of Private Occupational Schools as a private, for-profit institution.

=== The Four Savvys ===
"The Four Savvys" are defined by the Parellis as types of play with horses. Two of these, Online and Liberty, involve the human on the ground, and the horse typically is in a halter with an attached lead rope, but other methods of connection such a flank rope are also used. Liberty play involves a horse who is not physically connected to the human. Instead, the horse is asked to watch the body language of the human as its primary source of information about what they are supposed to be doing. The two riding categories are named Freestyle and Finesse. Freestyle consists of riding with infrequent or no contact with the horse's head or mouth. In finesse, the rider generally keeps close but gentle head/mouth contact and uses communication from body cues developed by practice with freestyle riding to give instructions to the horse about gross motor skill topics such as gait and direction while reserving the reins for discussions regarding refined elements such as bend in the body.

=== The Seven Games ===
Within the four savvys, Parelli Natural Horsemanship teaches the use of the "Seven Games" with horses. The Parellis state that these exercises emulate the behaviors that horses engage in with each other. The first three games are also known as the principal games, as the other four games, called the purpose games, consist of elements of these three games. The seven games are:

1. Friendly: also known as the confidence game, is designed to demonstrate to the horse that the human and their tools are not a threat and to establish a rapport with the horse.
2. Porcupine: a game of steady pressure that motivates the horse to move away from that pressure to obtain relief.
3. Driving: a game of rhythmic pressure that is used to motivate the horse to move.
4. Yo-yo: a game of "back and forth," which can mean that the horse backs away from the human and returns. Another type of yo-yo game involves the horse speeding up or slowing down.
5. Circling: often compared to longeing the horse, although Parelli asserts that the two are distinctly different. In the Circling Game, it is the horse's responsibility to maintain both the requested gait and direction instead of the human's responsibility to enforce the gait and direction.
6. Sideways: a game where the human causes the horse to move laterally.
7. Squeeze: a game where the human causes the horse to "squeeze" between objects.

=== Horsenality ===
The program uses a concept the Parellis call “horsenality” to explain the behavior of individual horses. The system is based on a model originally conceived by Linda Parelli but which was subjected to independent research by psychometric personality research specialists and that was overseen by statisticians at the Department of Education at the University of Kansas. Research consisted of assessing how experienced "horse" people in general view the differences in horses. Responses were subjected to the statistical process of factor analysis and two primary factors were derived. These orthogonal (opposite) factors were presented in a quadrant configuration labeled LBI, LBE, RBI, and RBE. There are many variants and overlapping grey zones that allow for more specific descriptions of horses. Again these are based on how humans view horses and therefore tend to approach them. The goal is to provide a positive language for perceiving horses and use this terminology to link to recommended natural training approaches.

A parallel model of assessing how people view themselves, also based on independent factor analysis, was created. Called Humanality, it allows people to look at their behavioral tendencies and explore what horse training strategies come natural to them and which ones they need to invest more time and practice in learning, especially if it is a method that works best with a particular horse. The objective is to customize natural horsemanship in ways that best serve the horse.

Both Horsenality and Humanality were developed independently from original research and the rigid statistical process of factor analysis. Horsenality and Humanality have no relationship to other assessments such as the MBTI (Myers Briggs Type Indicator), Marston's DiSC, or the Big Five (OCEAN). Any independent studies of correlations with these assessments, research into differences in horses, or examinations of differences in how people view horses is encouraged and will be supported by the Parelli organization. The more PNH can learn about how to help humans make the world a better place for horses, the better.

=== Endorsements and invitations ===
Karen and David O'Connor appeared in a video with Parelli at the 2002 Rolex Kentucky Three Day Event. Craig Johnson has ridden in PNH demonstrations, Walter Zettl has given Linda private dressage lessons for several years and features various Parelli products on his website. Other people who are well known in the equestrian world, such as Julie Krone, have said positive things about the Parelli method. Lauren Barwick, a gold- and silver-winning Paralympian dressage rider, has been coached by Parelli. Robert M. Miller has spoken favorably of Parelli in his books.

Pat Parelli appeared on The Dog Whisperer with Cesar Millan in the episode, "Cesar and the Horse Whisperer," and Millan has participated in one Parelli tour stop. In 2003, Pat Parelli was given an audience with Queen Elizabeth II at Buckingham Palace to demonstrate PNH and to interact with some of the Queen's horses. In 2009, The Humane Society of the United States named Pat Parelli as its Humane Horseman of the Year for "outstanding commitment to improving the welfare of America's horses".

=== Controversy ===
There has been criticism of the more prominent natural horsemanship practitioners in general, including Parelli (as well as Clinton Anderson and John Lyons), with suggestions that the movement is cultlike, in the sense that some practitioners and their followers condemn all other training methods, and that it is "gimmicky and over-commercialized," sells overpriced materials, and charges "exorbitant" prices for clinics and to obtain certification as a trainer. There is tension between the mainstream world of horse training and natural horsemanship advocates, each highly critical of the other.

Critics assert that Parelli has merely renamed traditional training techniques such as longeing, and in doing so, he markets horsemanship information that is widely available and has been passed down for generations, considered to be common sense by those knowledgeable of the horse. Critics of Parelli consider his methods to be inappropriately described as exclusive to the Parelli system. That said, Parelli agrees that his methods are not particularly new, and credits those from whom he learned.

Parelli has been criticized for renaming and rebranding standard horse training equipment that he sells for premium prices, critics noting that Parelli and non-Parelli versions of natural horsemanship equipment are virtually indistinguishable. Parelli advocates point to differences in materials and design in Parelli equipment, though similar designs are widely available outside of the Parelli brand.

Concerns have been raised that Parelli's methods may be "problematic" when used by less experienced horse handlers. What can be learned in a three-day clinic may not be adequate without additional hands-on guidance, especially in difficult circumstances such as adopting a rescue horse that presents additional challenges. Others note that similar difficulties can be expected in any circumstance wherein an inexperienced person is handling a horse without professional supervision. Parelli has commented that it is impossible to learn how to be a natural horseman "overnight" simply by watching his videos.

The Parellis have been subject to criticism because in most of their materials, they do not wear equestrian helmets and have published statements indicating they did not personally advocate their use other than for certain high-risk activities. In 2009 they amended their position, by publishing a statement on Facebook advocating helmet use for beginners, requiring it for children under 18 at their own facility, and advising all riders "to thoroughly evaluate their situation". As of 2016, they still do not advocate helmets for all riders in spite of Linda Parelli having been "knocked out" as a result of a fall from a horse that stumbled in May 2009. (Note: Savvy Club link not publicly available, but was widely distributed on chat forums.,)

=== Video controversies ===
In March 2010, video excerpts from a copyrighted Parelli training video were uploaded to YouTube, showing Linda Parelli handling a one-eyed horse on a lead rope. Some criticized Parelli for handling the horse in a rough manner. The Parellis later uploaded an interview where they address the abuse accusations. In mid-2010 Pat Parelli was videoed working with a stallion using a gum-line and holding up the horse's front leg with a rope. According to Horse & Hound, this demonstration caused an online "furore" with many angry comments about abuse. Parelli asserted that the horse was a risk to his handlers and an extreme example of equine behavior. The British Showjumping Association stated that the horse was found to be fit and well, and the owner of the horse, Robert Whitaker, said he felt the situation had been blown out of proportion.

== Sources ==
- Dr. Robert M. Miller & Rick Lamb (2005). The Revolution in Horsemanship. Globe Pequot. pp. 35–40. ISBN 9781592283873.
