= John Lyons (horse trainer) =

American horse trainer

- Born: 1947; United States
- Occupation: Horse trainer
- Children: Josh Lyons, Brandi Lyons, Sandy Lyons, Tammy Lyons

John Lyons is an American horse trainer in the field of natural horsemanship. Lyons has been presenting training clinics and horsemanship symposia since 1980, has written several books on horses and horse training, and is the founder of John Lyons' Perfect Horse magazine. He lives and works out of Parachute, Colorado.

== Philosophy ==
Lyons' approach of establishing a partnership between horse and handler is based in part on the principles of operant conditioning and he encourages owners to notice what is going on with their horses and to use consistent cues and reinforcement to encourage positive behavior and discourage negative behavior in the animal. He places a strong emphasis on safety of handler and horse, using gentle techniques, and eschewing dramatic results in favor of setting specific goals, then teaching them by use of clear signals, responsible methods, and consistency.

Lyons is somewhat different from other natural horsemanship practitioners in that his Christian faith plays a very public role in his presentations and materials. Beginning in 2010, Josh Lyons will move east and work out of Cross Plains, Tennessee, near Nashville. Father and son both offer a trainer's certification program to develop new horse trainers.

== Recognition ==
Awards given to Lyons for his work include Equitana USA's Modern Masters Award for Outstanding Horsemanship, and the University of Louisville's John W. Galbreath Award for outstanding contributions to the horse industry. Lyons' son, Josh Lyons, and daughter, Brandi Lyons are also trainers. John and Josh have competed in the invitation-only Road to the Horse competition, John Lyons doing so shortly after knee replacement surgery. Prior to the creation of the annual Road to the Horse competition, Josh Lyons won the original "In a Whisper" competition in 2002, a head-to-head horse training challenge between himself, Pat Parelli and Craig Cameron, which was made into a film documentary.

Lyons gained both support and notoriety due to his critique of the film The Horse Whisperer, noting that while there were many positive messages, there was also the potential for people to get some dangerous messages about horse training from certain sequences. He first noted that the multiple horses that played Pilgrim were all well-trained animals and that the movie did not represent a real-life time frame for training a single real-life animal. He pointed out that the film made the rehabilitation of the horse appear to be a one-session event, when in reality it would take considerable time for such a change to occur. Lyons criticized a number of dangerous practices shown in the movie, and was particularly critical of the scene where the lead character hobbles, ropes, and lays the exhausted horse on the ground, then has the horse's owner, a girl with an amputated limb, get on the recumbent horse, which is then allowed to rise, and the horse and girl miraculously are both cured of their fears and once again a horse and rider team. He argued that the actual real-life practical risk of injury to horse and human in such a method is considerable, that a horse pushed to exhaustion is not "trained," and pushing a fearful rider in such a fashion is ill-advised. However, Lyons' critique also recognized the limitations of Hollywood filmmaking, stating, "In order to tell a story, things are often done that would be imprudent for horse owners to attempt."

== Works by Lyons ==
- Lyons, John and Jennifer J. Denison.(2002) Bringing Up Baby. Primedia Enthusiast Publications. ISBN 1-929164-12-2.
- Lyons, John with Sinclair Browning. (1991) Lyons On Horses: John Lyons' Proven Conditioned-Response Training Program. Doubleday, ISBN 0-385-41398-X, ISBN 978-0-385-41398-5
- Lyons, John. (2006) John Lyons' Troubleshooting Primedia Equine Network, ISBN 1-929164-31-9, ISBN 978-1-929164-31-8
- Lyons, John with Maureen Gallatin. (three part series, 1998, 1999) Communicating with Cues: The Rider's Guide to Training and Problem Solving Belvoir Publications, Inc. ISBN 1-879620-55-3, ISBN 978-1-879620-55-1 (part 1)

== Bibliography ==
- Harris, Moira C. Mastering the Art of Horsemanship: John Lyon's Spiritual Journey Bowtie Press, 2003. ISBN 978-1-889540-93-1
- Miller, Robert and Richard Lamb. Revolution in Horsemanship. Lyons Press, 2005. ISBN 1-59228-387-X. Reviews the various methods and schools of what today is known as "Natural horsemanship."
