= The Horse Whisperer (film) =

1998 neo-western drama film by Robert Redford

- Theatrical release poster
- Directed by: Robert Redford
- Written by: Eric Roth; Richard LaGravenese
- Based on: The Horse Whisperer by Nicholas Evans
- Produced by: Robert Redford; Patrick Markey
- Starring: Robert Redford; Kristin Scott Thomas; Sam Neill; Dianne Wiest; Scarlett Johansson; Chris Cooper
- Cinematography: Robert Richardson
- Edited by: Hank Corwin; Freeman Davies; Tom Rolf
- Music by: Thomas Newman
- Production company: Touchstone Pictures
- Distributed by: Buena Vista Pictures Distribution
- Release date: May 15, 1998
- Running time: 169 minutes
- Country: United States
- Language: English
- Budget: $60 million
- Box office: $187 million

The Horse Whisperer is a 1998 American neo-western drama film directed by and starring Robert Redford, based on the 1995 novel The Horse Whisperer by Nicholas Evans. Redford plays the title role, a talented trainer with a remarkable gift for understanding horses, who is hired to help an injured teenager (played by Scarlett Johansson) and her horse back to health following a tragic accident.

The film was produced by Touchstone Pictures and released on May 15, 1998 by Buena Vista Pictures Distribution. It received generally positive reviews from critics and grossed nearly $187 million worldwide.

== Plot ==
In Lake Luzerne, New York, teenagers Grace MacLean and her best friend Judith go out early one winter's morning to ride their horses, Pilgrim and Gulliver. As they ride up an icy slope, Gulliver slips and hits Pilgrim. Both horses fall, dragging the girls onto a road, where they are hit by a tractor-trailer. Judith and Gulliver are killed, while Grace and Pilgrim are severely injured.

Grace, left with a partially amputated right leg, is bitter and withdrawn after the accident. Meanwhile, Pilgrim is traumatized and uncontrollable to the extent that it is suggested he be put down. Grace's mother Annie, a strong-minded, workaholic magazine editor, refuses to allow it, sensing that Grace's recovery is linked with Pilgrim's.

Desperate for a way to heal Grace and Pilgrim, Annie tracks down a "horse whisperer", Tom Booker, in the remote Montana mountains. Tom agrees to help but only if Grace takes part in the process. Grace reluctantly agrees, and she and Annie go to stay at the Booker ranch where Tom lives with his brother and his brother's family.

As Pilgrim and Grace slowly overcome their trauma, Annie and Tom develop a mutual attraction. However, they are both reluctant to act on these feelings – Annie is married, and Tom had his heart broken when his wife left him because she belonged in the city. Tom asks Grace to tell him what happened with her and Pilgrim to understand what Pilgrim is feeling. At first, Grace is reluctant, but she eventually gathers the courage to describe the accident.

The status quo between Annie and Tom is broken when Robert MacLean, Grace's father and Annie's husband, unexpectedly shows up at the ranch. Annie is torn between her feelings for Tom and her love for her family. Soon, with Tom's help, Grace takes the last step to heal herself and Pilgrim – riding Pilgrim again. As the MacLeans get ready to leave the ranch, Robert tells Annie that he wants her to make a choice and not to come home until she is sure.

Although Annie wishes she could stay with Tom on the ranch, she knows that she belongs in the city, just like Tom's wife. She departs while Tom watches her go from the top of a hill.

== Cast ==
- Robert Redford as Tom Booker
- Kristin Scott Thomas as Annie MacLean
- Sam Neill as Robert MacLean
- Dianne Wiest as Dianne Booker
- Scarlett Johansson as Grace MacLean
- Chris Cooper as Frank Booker
- Cherry Jones as Liz Hammond
- Ty Hillman as Joe Booker
- Kate Bosworth as Judith
- Jessalyn Gilsig as Lucy, Annie's assistant
- Jeanette Nolan as Mrs. Ellen Booker
- Allison Moorer as Barn Dance Vocalist
- Stephen Pearlman as David Gottschalk
- Joelle Carter as Office Worker #1
- Gloria Lynne Henry as Member of Magazine Staff
- Betty Buckley as Tom Booker's ex-girlfriend (cut sequence)

== Production ==
Although he had already directed several films, this was the first time Robert Redford directed a film that he also starred in.

The main character, according to writer Nicholas Evans, is modeled after horse whisperers Tom Dorrance, Ray Hunt and, in particular, their younger disciple Buck Brannaman. Brannaman also doubled for Robert Redford in the film and served as the consultant. Redford likewise assisted in the production of the documentary Buck. Evans said, "Others have claimed to be the inspiration for Tom Booker in The Horse Whisperer. The one who truly inspired me was Buck Brannaman. His skill, understanding, and gentle, loving heart have parted the clouds for countless troubled creatures. Buck is the Zen master of the horse world."

== Horse training accuracy ==
The schooling administered to the traumatized horse in the film is faithful to a number of basic natural horsemanship techniques, although the portrayal in the film does not follow the specific method of any one practitioner. Nicholas Evans writes: "I spent many weeks traveling across the West and met three amazing horsemen: Tom Dorrance, Ray Hunt and Buck Brannaman."

While Brannaman was the on-site technical consultant, he did not have creative control. The constraints of film-making required several sequences showing horse training methods to be edited for length. This meant certain critical training elements that would normally be used were not presented on screen. Lapses in safety were also shown in the film such as Redford kneeling in front of a horse known to charge humans, and wearing a large ring on his finger while holding a rope while handling a dangerous horse.

The plot also used an improbable scenario that was contrary to basic horse psychology. Pilgrim, an apparently well-trained horse, suddenly becomes vicious following a single traumatic event. Horses may have a strong reaction to an incident or there were elements that preceded the trauma that had been repeated (for example, Pilgrim developed a fear of vehicles, crossing roads, or steep slopes from past experience). However, a complete change in personality, manner, and outlook would normally be the result of sustained, long-term animal abuse.

John Lyons, a practitioner of natural horsemanship, noted that while there were many positive messages in the film, he was concerned audiences might get an inaccurate message about horse training. First Pilgrim was portrayed in the film by multiple well-trained animals. Second the movie did not represent a real-life time frame for training a single real-life animal. He pointed out that the film made the rehabilitation of the horse appear to be a one-session event when in reality it would take considerable time for such a change to occur. Lyons criticized a number of dangerous practices shown in the movie, and was particularly critical of the scene where Booker hobbles, ropes, and lays the exhausted horse on the ground, then has Grace get on the recumbent horse, which is then allowed to rise, and the horse and girl miraculously are both cured of their fears and once again a horse and rider team. He argued that the actual real-life practical risk of injury to horse and human in such a method is considerable, that a horse pushed to exhaustion is not "trained", and pushing a fearful rider in such a fashion is ill-advised. However, Lyons' critique also recognized the limitations of Hollywood film-making, stating, "In order to tell a story, things are often done that would be imprudent for horse owners to attempt."

== Reception ==
=== Box office ===
The Horse Whisperer grossed $74.4 million in the United States and Canada, and $111.5 million in other territories, for a worldwide total of $186.9 million.

In its opening weekend, the film made $13.7 million and finished in second, then made $14.5 million and $7.5 million the following two weekends.

=== Critical response ===
On Rotten Tomatoes, the film holds an approval rating of 73% based on 63 reviews, with an average rating of 7.1/10. The website's critics consensus reads: "It might be a bit too eager to tug the heartstrings, but The Horse Whisperer is typically graceful, well-crafted Redford—on both sides of the camera." At Metacritic, the film has a weighted average score of 65 out of 100, based on 19 critics, indicating "generally favorable reviews". Audiences polled by CinemaScore gave the film an average grade of "A−" on an A+ to F scale.

Janet Maslin in The New York Times says that the film "sustains great visual intensity thanks to Robert Richardson's majestic cinematography" but its "rock-solid values" are diluted by "a misconceived ending", whereas CNN in a rather sarcastic review complains that the storytelling was "all done very, very slowly" and mentions the film's length. Film critics Gene Siskel and Roger Ebert gave the film "two thumbs up" on their weekly TV show At the Movies. In his movie guide, Leonard Maltin gave the film 3 1/2 out of 4 stars, calling it "an exquisite rendering of Evans' novel".

The song "A Soft Place to Fall" by Allison Moorer and Gwil Owen was nominated for the Academy Award for Best Original Song. Moorer performs the song in the movie. The film was nominated for Best Motion Picture – Drama and Redford for Best Director at the 56th Golden Globe Awards.

== In popular culture ==
The movie's popularity led to the word "whisperer" being used as a slang term for anyone with a strong affinity for a particular animal or being. For instance, in the 2015 biographical feature film Steve Jobs, Apple CEO John Sculley (Jeff Daniels) has a talk with Steve Jobs (Michael Fassbender) because Jobs is perceived to be difficult to communicate with, and Sculley is perceived to be a "Steve whisperer".

== See also ==
- List of films about horses
- John Solomon Rarey, mid-nineteenth century horse whisperer
