= Groveport School =

National Register of Historic Places listing in Groveport, Ohio

- U.S. National Register of Historic Places
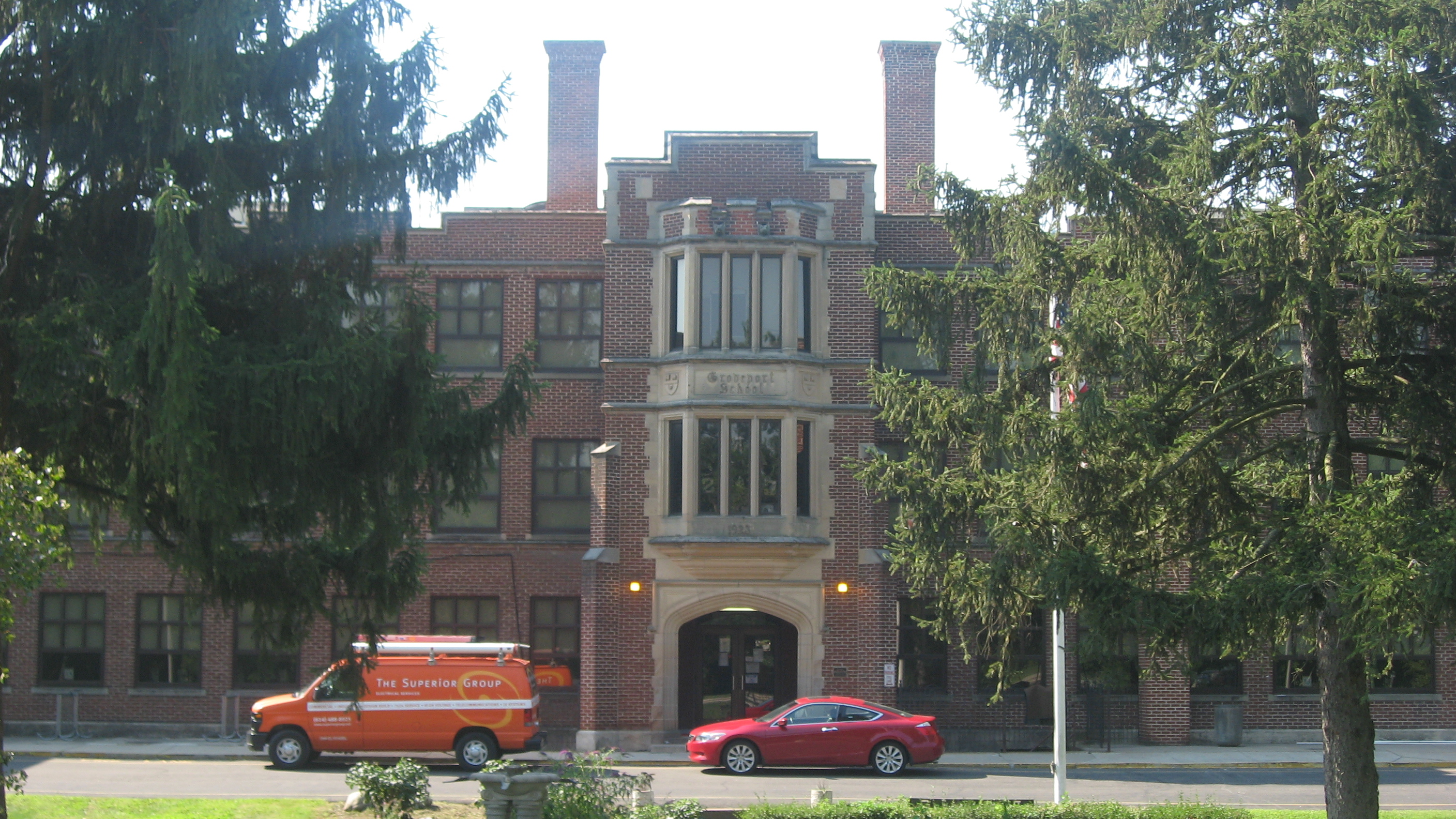
- Front

- Location within Ohio Location within the United States
- Location: 715 E. Main St, Groveport, Ohio
- Coordinates: 39.850474°N 82.880915°W
- Built: 1923
- Architectural style: Late 19th and 20th Century Revival
- NRHP reference No.: 09000564
- Added to NRHP: July 24, 2009

Groveport School, also known as Groveport Elementary School, is a historic school in Groveport, Ohio. Built in 1921 and opened in 1923, it was admitted into the National Register of Historic Places in 2009.

== History ==
In August 1921, the Board of Education for the Groveport Madison school district passed a bond levy to build Groveport School. It first opened in 1923. After the construction of other nearby schools, only Groveport Elementary remained at Groveport School by the 1950s.

Groveport School is partially located on the property of what used to be Elmont Hotel, which used to be the residence of horse whisperer John Solomon Rarey. The rest of Elmont Hotel was purchased and demolished in 1950 to make room for a new high school.

In 2009, Groveport School was listed on the National Register of Historic Places, predominantly because of its historic architecture. Elements of late 19th and 20th century Revival architecture are still present.
