= Clinton Anderson (horse trainer) =

Australian horse trainer

Clinton Anderson is an Australian-American natural horsemanship practitioner. He created a training program known as Downunder Horsemanship. He is featured in a number of magazine articles on horse training, has written a book about his methods, is a clinician who tours the United States, and has a television program on RFD-TV as well as an internet TV presence.

== Early life ==
Anderson was born and raised in Australia. He left school at age 15 to begin a series of apprenticeships with several Australian horse trainers. Three years later, he opened his own training facility.

== Career ==
Anderson moved to the United States in 1996. In 1997, he began teaching nationwide horsemanship clinics. In 2001, he launched his own TV show. He has competed in national reining competitions. In 2003, he competed in the first Road to the Horse colt-starting competition and won, defeating Curt Pate and John Lyons' son, Josh Lyons. In 2005, he won the second Road to the Horse competition over Craig Cameron and Van Hargis. He competed in 2007, but lost to Chris Cox. He competed in 2011, again losing to Chris Cox. He most recently competed in 2016, losing to Nick Dowers.

In 2020, Anderson moved from his previous training facility in Stephenville, Texas to Farmington, Arkansas. There, he continues to operate Downunder Horsemanship.
