= Parelli =

Parelli, Parrelli or Parellis may refer to:

== People ==
- Apostolos Parellis (born 1985), Cypriot athlete
- Attilio Parelli (1874–1944), Italian composer
- Josie Parrelli, Australian radio DJ
- Pat Parelli (born 1954), American horse trainer
  - Parelli Natural Horsemanship

== Characters ==
- Dave Parelli in TV series Rude Awakening
- Doug Parelli in TV series Soul Food
- Vinnie Parelli in 1974 TV movie The Last Angry Man, played by Del Russell
