= Willis J. Powell =

Willis J. Powell is the author of Tachyhippodamia; on The New Secret of Taming Horses to which John Solomon Rarey's work, Taming of Wild Horses, was appended for publication. This book was issued before Powell died in 1848, but no publishing date is stated in the book itself. A later reprint was in 1872, in Philadelphia, by the W.R. Charter publishing house. It can still be purchased as a rare book and as reprinted by the University of Michigan. Powell mentions the Irish "horse whisperer" Daniel Sullivan in the preface to his own book, and says that Sullivan may have possessed the same method. Later in that same book, Powell recounts hearing of a man who had lived a century earlier and who had a secret method of taming horses, and resolving to discover that method.

Powell traveled from Louisiana to Mexico, living there for about 12 years, and then to Cuba, Guatemala and California, taming horses. He apparently made a good living doing so. He also was a polyglot, speaking five languages: English, French, Greek, Latin and Spanish.

== The method ==
Powell says that the way became clear before him when he first realized that horses only offer resistance to humans because of fear. In order to tame a horse one must first quell their fears. To communicate calm and safety to the horse, nothing is more powerful than soothing touch. Once the horse is feeling safe it can become accustomed to things that might otherwise cause it alarm. (p. 33f)

Powell outlines steps by which an untamed horse may be approached without arousing alarm, how it may next be touched on larger and larger portions of its body. The same procedure of desensitization is to be followed in regard to all things in the horse-human environment that might cause unneeded fear. Finally, any fear of a saddle is handled in the same way. (p. 33-46)
