= Clinton Anderson =

Clinton Anderson may refer to:

- Clinton Anderson (New Mexico politician) (1949–1973), American politician who represented New Mexico in the United States Senate
- Clinton Anderson (Wisconsin politician) (born 1993), member of the Wisconsin State Assembly
- Clinton Anderson (horse trainer), Australian-American natural horsemanship practitioner
