= Stacy Westfall =

American professional horse trainer

Stacy Westfall (born September 26, 1974) is an American professional horse trainer who specializes in reining. In 2006, she became the first woman to compete in and win the Road to the Horse competition. In 2006, she also won the All American Quarter Horse Congress Freestyle Reining competition on the black mare, Whizards Baby Doll, riding both bridleless and bareback.

== Early life and career ==
Westfall grew up in South China, Maine. While her parents were not horse professionals, her mother was her instructor until Westfall went to college at the University of Findlay in Ohio.

Westfall began to perform bridleless in freestyle reining, a form of reining competition where exhibitors design their own routines and perform to music, after accidentally dropping a rein while in a traditional reining competition.

In 2003, Westfall was awarded NRHA Futurity Freestyle Champion (Bridleless).

In 2006, she was the first woman to compete in the Road to the Horse colt starting competition, and its first female winner.

Also in 2006, Westfall was the All American Quarter Horse Congress Freestyle Champion, performing with her mare Roxy. On March 14, 2008, Ellen DeGeneres interviewed Westfall on her program and welcomed both Westfall and Roxy to the studio. Roxy lived until February 8, 2012, having won multiple championships across her life.

Westfall also gives clinics, trains horses, and competes in reining.
