= Pat Parelli =

American horse trainer (b. 1954)

- Born: 17 March 1954 (age 72); Livermore, California, U.S.
- Occupation: Horse trainer
- Spouse(s): Karen Parelli Hagen, Linda Parelli (m. 1995 div. 2020)

Pat Parelli (born 1954) is an American horse trainer who practices natural horsemanship and founded the Parelli Natural Horsemanship program.

== Early life and career ==
Parelli was born in 1954 in Livermore, California. As a child, he worked as a stablehand for nearby horse facilities. He competed in rodeo during high school and then graduated from Fresno State University with a degree in agricultural education. He then competed in professional rodeo and was named the Professional Rodeo Cowboys Association's Bareback Rookie of the year in 1972.

== Personal life ==
Parelli's first wife was Karen, and the couple had a son and a daughter. Their son, Caton, was born in 1984. Caton had hydrocephalus at birth and at one time it was feared he would never be able to walk or talk. However, the child overcame his difficulties and learned to speak, to ride horses, and as an adult has shown American Quarter Horses in cutting and reining. Their daughter was named Marlene. Karen was a co-author for Parelli's first book, Natural Horse-Man-Ship. Karen and Pat divorced; Karen remarried a man named Jim Hagen, and today the Hagens run a horsemanship program in California called Natural Hoofprints.

Parelli's second wife (now divorced) is Linda Parelli(née Paterson, born in 1958). She was born in Singapore and grew up in Australia. She met Parelli in Australia in 1989 while he was still married to Karen, after seeing his videos in a tack store. She helped coordinate and promote Pat's clinics in Australia and came to America in 1992. It is the second marriage for both. Since 1996, Parelli has been headquartered in Pagosa Springs, Colorado.

=== Linda Parelli ===
Linda moved to Australia when she was a child, and soon convinced her parents to buy her a horse, and then two. When she was young, she competed in Pony Club and gymkhana. As an adult, she trained as an esthetician and became the education director for an Australian skin-care company. Wanting to return to having horses in her life, she bought a Thoroughbred horse with a goal of competing in eventing, but because the horse was very difficult to handle, she attempted to use dressage methods for training, even though she considered dressage “the most boring thing possible.” Unsuccessful with that methodology, she attended a Parelli clinic, as she had been impressed with his videos demonstrating bridleless riding, and found success with her horse using Parelli's methods. In turn, her skills in marketing and education turned around the Parelli program financially. The program as it is structured today is credited as co-founded by Parelli and his second wife, Linda.

== Natural horsemanship ==
Parelli first came to the public's attention in 1981 when he rode a mule in the National Reined Cow Horse Association Snaffle Bit Futurity. From November 1983 to January 1984 he and Dr. Robert M. Miller coauthored a three-part series in Western Horseman titled A New Look at an Old Method. Parelli is widely credited within the community with coining the phrase "Natural Horsemanship" and using it to market the program he developed. He is also credited as the founder of his own program, Parelli Natural Horsemanship, although his former spouse, Karen Parelli Hagen, has stated that she worked with Parelli in creating the original program.

== Famous Quotes ==
"People usually don’t take the time to do things right, but take the time to do it wrong over and over again."

== Sources ==
- Dr. Robert M. & Rick Lamb (2005). The Revolution in Horsemanship. Globe Pequot. pp. 35–40. ISBN 9781592283873.
