= Robert M. Miller =

American veterinarian and equine behaviorist (1927–2024)

- Born: March 4, 1927; New York City, U.S.
- Died: November 16, 2024 (aged 97)
- Education: Colorado State University
- Occupations: Equine behaviorist and veterinarian
- Spouse: Debby Miller

Robert M. Miller (March 4, 1927 – November 16, 2024) was an American equine behaviorist and veterinarian, best recognized for his system of training newborn foals known as imprint training. Miller is also one of the early adopters and promoters of relationship-based horsemanship. His work is often referred to by equine clinicians. He has served as a judge in the annual Road to the Horse competition, and also was a co-founder of the "Light Hands Horsemanship" concept and annual clinic.

== Early life ==
Miller was born in New York on March 4, 1927, and raised in Tucson, Arizona. After serving in the infantry overseas in World War II, he attended and graduated from the veterinary school at Colorado State University in 1956. He established the Conejo Valley Veterinary Clinic in Thousand Oaks, California in 1959. Miller's experience with horses dates to his childhood and included work as a wrangler, trail guide, and rodeo hand.

== Career ==
Miller has authored scientific papers and magazine articles for both veterinary journals and equine publications, and has published 23 books and numerous DVD's on equine behavior, health, and horsemanship. He has served on the editorial staff of Veterinary Medicine, for which he is best known for his long-running “Mind Over Miller” column, as well as Modern Veterinary Practice, Veterinary Forum, and Western Horseman magazines. He was also a prolific veterinary and cowboy cartoonist who has published seven cartoon books under the moniker, "RMM".

Miller has received professional awards for his achievements in both veterinary medicine and equine behavior from all over the world. In 2004, Dr. Miller was inducted into the Hall of Fame by the Western States Horse Expo, and is a recipient of the Bustad Companion Animal Veterinarian of the Year Award in 1995.

Miller retired from practice in 1987, in order to devote himself full-time to the teaching of equine behavior and to support the relationship-based horsemanship movement. He continued to travel and lecture well into his 90s.

== Personal life and death ==
Until his death on November 16, 2024 at the age of 97, Miller resided on his ranch in Thousand Oaks, California with his wife, Debby.

== Works ==
=== Books ===
==== Self-published books ====
- The Passion For Horses & Artistic Talent - An Unrecognized Connection. Robert M Miller Communications. (2010) ISBN 978-0-9844620-0-1
- Yes, We Treat Aardvarks - Stories From An Extraordinary Veterinary Practice. Robert M Miller Communications. (2010) ISBN 978-0-9844620-1-8
- Handling Equine Patients - A Handbook For Veterinary Students & Veterinary Technicians. Robert M. Miller Communications. (2010) ISBN 0984462023
- Ranchin', Ropin' an' Doctorin'. Robert M Miller Communications. (2011) ISBN 978-0-9844620-3-2

==== Commercially published ====
- Natural horsemanship explained : from heart to hands. The Lyons Press, (2007) ISBN 978-1-59921-234-0
- The Revolution in Horsemanship (and What It Means to Mankind), with Rick Lamb. The Lyons Press. (2005) ISBN 1-59228-387-X
- Understanding the Ancient Secrets of the Horse's Mind. Russell Meerdink Company. (1999) ISBN 0929346653
- Imprint Training of the Newborn Foal. Western Horseman Publishing. (2003 ISBN 1585746665 / 1991 Vintage ISBN 9781585746668)
- Most of My Patients Are Animals. Paul Eriksson Publishing Company. (1987) ISBN 9780491032575
- Health Problems of the Horse. Western Horseman Publishing. (1967, Revised 1988) ISBN 9780911647136

=== Videos ===
- Lameness: Its Causes & Prevention (Video Velocity, 2012)
- Safer Horsemanship (Video Velocity, 1999)
- Understanding Horses (Video Velocity, 1999)
- Early Learning (Video Velocity, 1995)
- Control of the Horse - The Art Of Restraint (Video Horse World, 1994)
- Imprint Training of the Foal (Palomine Productions, 1986)
- Influencing the Horse's Mind (Palomine Productions, 1984)

== Bibliography ==
- D.V.M., Robert M. Miller (2010). Handling Equine Patients - A Handbook for Veterinary Students & Veterinary Technicians. Robert M Miller Communications. ISBN 9780984462025.
