= Groveport Town Hall Historic Group =

Historic buildings in Groveport, Ohio

- U.S. National Register of Historic Places
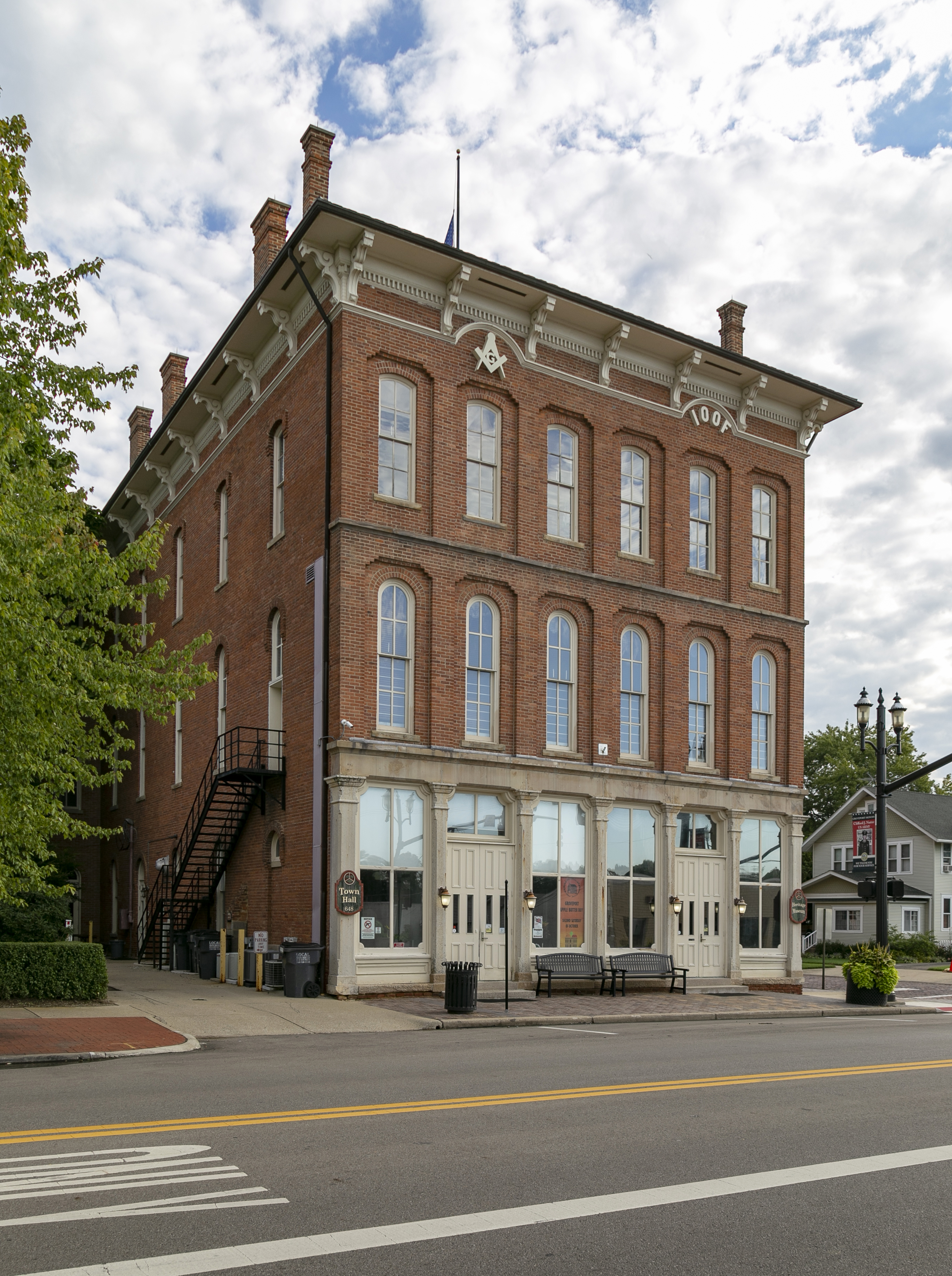
- Groveport Town Hall in 2021

- Location within Ohio Location within the United States
- Location: 628-632 Main St & Main & Front Sts, Groveport, Ohio, U.S.
- Coordinates: 39.8513°N 82.8825°W
- Built: c. 1840 & 1878
- Architectural style: High Victorian Italianate
- NRHP reference No.: 78002067
- Added to NRHP: July 31, 1978

The Groveport Town Hall Historic Group is a group of historic buildings located in Groveport, Ohio. It includes the Groveport Town Hall, Faulhaber-Fornshell residence, and the Rarey-Giehl residence. Built in c. 1840 and 1878, the group was listed in the National Register of Historic Places on July 31, 1978.

The first of the Historic Group buildings to be constructed was the Rarey-Giehl residence, sometime around 1840. Groveport Town Hall was constructed in 1876, followed by the Faulhaber-Fornshell residence in 1878. Groveport Town Hall is three stories high and incorporates High Victorian Italianate architecture. Town Hall was constructed in a joint project between what was then the Village of Groveport, Madison Township, and two local lodges. The land on which Town Hall currently sits was sold to the Village of Groveport in 1857 by William H. Rarey.
