= Mark Brisbourne =

English horse trainer and jockey

Mark Brisbourne is an English horse trainer and former jockey who is based in Shrewsbury, Shropshire, England. As of 2011, Mark was the top ranked trainers for wins on Wolverhampton Racecourse over ten seasons. He has had continued success at Wolverhampton Racecourse where the surface is the same as at his own training facilities.

He was also top horse trainer at Chester Racecourse for three consecutive seasons, from 2006 through to 2008.

Mark rose to prominence with a shock win at Newmarket Racecourse in 2003 with 800-guinea filly Milly Waters. The horse beat race favourite Ticker Tape ridden by Frankie Dettori by one and a half lengths. The horse was the cheapest horse in the field of 29. Racing victories achieved on horses that were purchased for relatively low prices like with Milly Waters have become the hallmark of the trainer.

Mark is divorced from Pamela Joan and has five children, Barry, Ben, Charlie, Rebecca and Rachel. Ben competed in the 2007 Bollinger Series for male amateur riders.
