= Jesse Beery =

Horse trainer and author (1861–1945)

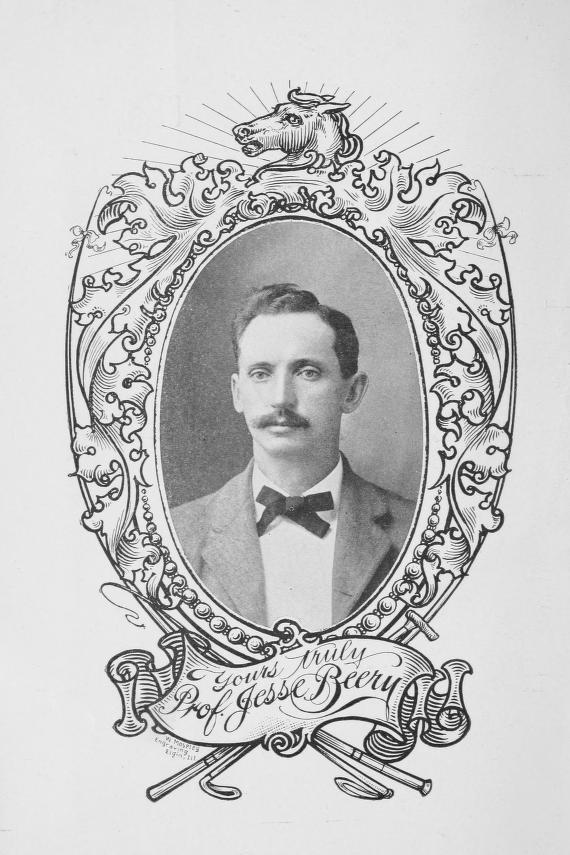
- Born: June 13, 1861; Pleasant Hill, Ohio
- Died: August 13, 1945 (aged 84)
- Occupations: author, horse trainer
- Writing career
- Notable works: Professor Jesse Beery Mail Course in Horsemanship; Prof. Beery's Saddle-Horse Instructions

Professor Jesse Beery (June 13, 1861 – February, 1945) was an American horse trainer and writer. He claimed he could train any horse, horses that ran away, horses that pulled too hard, horses that were spooked too easily and horses that refused to be shoed. His best-known work was Prof. Beery's Mail Course in Horsemanship, and sold widely through mail-order ads placed in various equine magazines. His horse training methods are claimed to have been used by horse trainers all over the world over the last hundred years.

== Early life ==
Jesse Beery was the son of Enoch and Mary Beery. The Beery family, with its eight members, resided in Pleasant Hill, Ohio. While Mary Beery lived only until Jesse was 7 years of age, Enoch farmed until he was 82 years old, and lived until 1905. Attending school at Covington and Pleasant Hill, Jesse worked on his family farm where as a very young man he discovered his intense interest in and skill at handling animals.

It did not take long for him to decide that his abilities with animals were rare, and he began to visit various areas of the country in order to display his techniques. After 16 years of impressing spectators with his talents, Jesse eventually wound up with a greater volume of demand for his work than he could handle.

== Jesse Beery School of Correspondence in Horsemanship ==
In 1905, Beery made the decision to go back to his hometown and start an educational enterprise he would call the Jesse Beery School of Correspondence in Horsemanship. The main objective was to help others gain the skills and mastery that he believed he possessed. He propounded common sense horse training methods, and even today, his supporters claim him to be one of very few horse trainers to have had this kind of far-reaching effect.

According to the 1919 publication, 'Memoirs of Miami Valley (Ohio) Vol 1' ( Page 627): "Beery Correspondence School for Horsemanship is a most unusual enterprise, being the only school of its kind in the world. It was started by Professor Jesse Beery, a native of Pleasant Hill, who had been an expert trainer of horses for 20 years, giving exhibitions in all parts of the United States for many years before starting his correspondence school. There are a number of courses taught by mail, including "colt training, vicious horse training, how to ride and train saddle horses, animal breeding and feeding." Seventy-five thousand students have taken his courses. On the roll now are pupils in New Zealand, South Africa and Australia. The business makes quite a difference in the postoffice at Pleasant Hill, as the Beery mail averages 2,500 letters and inquiries a day in January, February and March, received from all parts of the world."

This same information can also be seen at the 'Dayton History Books' website under the section for 'Pleasant Hill'. The Beery school was incorporated in 1908.

In addition to his unique talents in the realm of horse training, he was the inventor of an array of implements he claimed to be intended to help gain mastery over the animals he oversaw, creating an assortment of tools, bridles and bits that were also sold via mail order. The correspondence school was said to be inundated with scores of letters and notes throughout its history containing endless gratitude and respect for the techniques promulgated by its founder.

== Death and legacy ==
Beery died February 22, 1945, and is buried at Pleasant Hill Cemetery in Pleasant Hill, Ohio. His legacy in the world of horse training still is noted and his techniques are still being taught, many thousands of students have learned his approach.

== Bibliography ==
1. Professor Jesse Beery Mail Course in Horsemanship: A complete course with detailed instructions on many aspects of horse training. The methods have been and still being applied by horse trainers all over the world. The book is currently out of print, though reprints of the original Professor Jesse Beery Mail Course in Horsemanship exist.
2. Prof. Beery's Saddle-Horse Instructions
