= Mark Rashid =

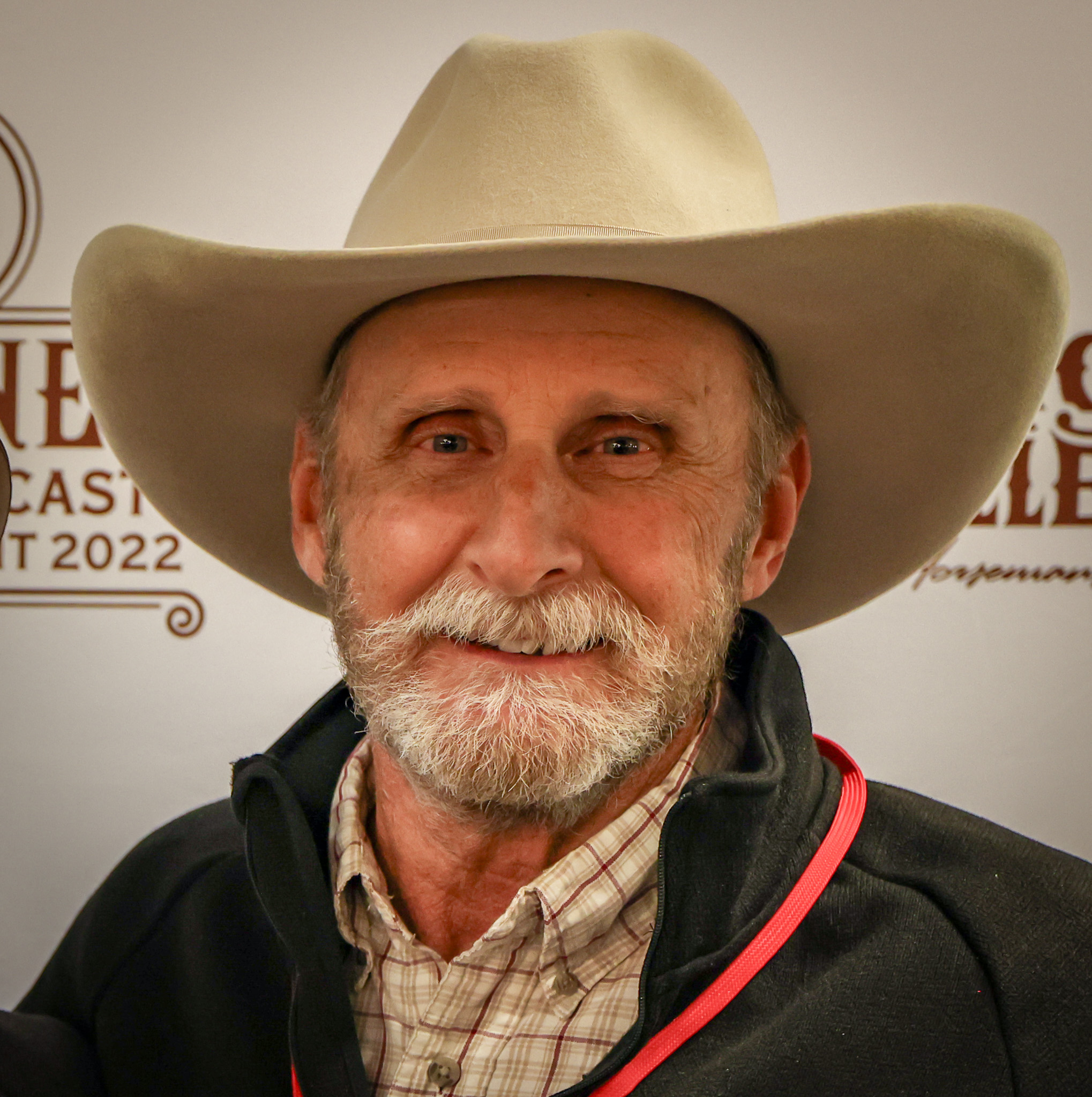
- Mark Rashid at The Journey On Podcast in San Antonio, Texas. 2022
- Occupations: Horse trainer, instructor, author
- Notable work: Horses Never Lie; For The Love of Horses
- Spouse: Crissi McDonald(married 1950–present)
- Website: https://www.markrashid.com/

Mark Rashid is an American horse trainer, clinician, and author from Estes Park, Colorado. Practicing within the western riding tradition, Rashid's philosophy involves understanding the horse's point of view and solving difficult problems with communication rather than force. His methodology emphasizes the relationship between horse and rider as a partnership, in which the horse willingly takes direction from the rider, rather than a dominant rider directing a submissive horse. His training has been used with horses and riders in all disciplines, including dressage, eventing, jumpers, endurance riders, professional reiners, and cutting horses.

While Rashid is grouped as a practitioner within the field of natural horsemanship, he personally tends to avoid that classification and has publicly expressed discomfort with the term when applied to himself and to horsemanship in general.

Rashid has written a number of books including Big Horses, Good Dogs, & Straight Fences, Horsemanship Through Life, Life Lessons from a Ranch Horse, Horses Never Lie, A Good Horse is Never a Bad Color, Considering the Horse, and Nature in Horsemanship: Discovering Harmony Through Principles of Aikido.

In 2022 Rashid and his wife, Crissi McDonald, presented at The Journey On Podcast Summit in San Antonio, Texas

Rashid is also a practitioner of Yoshinkan aikido and applies its principles to the art of riding.
