= The Horse Whisperer (novel) =

1995 novel by Nicholas Evans

- First edition cover
- Author: Nicholas Evans
- Language: English
- Publisher: Delacorte Press
- Publication date: 1995
- Media type: Print (hardback and paperback) and audio CD
- Pages: 678 pp (first edition, hardcover)
- ISBN: 978-0-385-31523-4 (first edition, hardcover)

The Horse Whisperer is a 1995 novel by English author Nicholas Evans. The book was his debut novel, and gained significant success, becoming the 10th-best selling novel in the United States in 1995, selling over 15 million copies. This also makes it one of the best-selling books of all time. In 2003 the novel appeared at number 195 on the BBC's The Big Read poll of the UK's "best-loved novels".

The book was made into a film, also titled The Horse Whisperer, directed by and starring Robert Redford.

== Summary ==
The novel starts in upstate New York where a teenage girl, Grace Maclean, and her friend, Judith, go riding on their horses, Pilgrim and Gulliver, on a snowy morning. As they ride up an icy slope, Gulliver slips and hits Pilgrim. Both horses fall, dragging the girls into a road and into a collision with a tractor-trailer. Judith and Gulliver are killed, while Grace and Pilgrim are severely injured. Grace, left with a partially amputated right leg, is bitter and withdrawn. Grace's mother, Annie, is a workaholic magazine editor, and her father, Robert, is a lawyer. The different approaches taken by each of Grace's parents in dealing with the accident strain relationships within the family.

Following the accident, Pilgrim is traumatised and uncontrollable, leading his caretakers to mistreat him and to suggest that he be put down. Annie refuses to allow her horse to be put down and hears of a 'horse whisperer', Tom Booker. She undertakes a long cross country journey with Pilgrim and Grace to Montana.

On the Montana ranch, Tom works with Pilgrim and starts to make progress. Both Grace and Annie become happier because the ranch life suits them. During the stay, Annie and Tom become close and eventually begin an affair.

Despite the progress that Tom has made with Pilgrim, Grace is still unable to ride the horse. Tom attempts a drastic intervention by forcing the horse to lie down and having Grace stand on him. This technique works and horse and rider are reunited.

At the party marking the end of Grace's and Annie's stay in Montana, Grace finds out about the affair, and she rides recklessly into the countryside. Grace unintentionally rides into a herd of wild mustangs that begin a stampede. Tom rides after her and finds Pilgrim fighting with the mustang stallion. Tom manages to save Grace and Pilgrim, but then deliberately gets himself fatally trampled by the stallion, perhaps because he feels guilty about hurting Grace by having an affair with her mother.

Grace, Annie, and Pilgrim return to New York to rebuild their lives with Robert, but Annie discovers she is pregnant and eventually gives birth to a baby with Tom's blue eyes.

== Inspiration ==
According to writer Nicholas Evans, Tom Booker is modelled after horse whisperers Tom Dorrance, Ray Hunt and, in particular, their younger disciple Buck Brannaman. Evans has said, "Others have claimed to be the inspiration for Tom Booker in The Horse Whisperer. The one who truly inspired me was Buck Brannaman. His skill, understanding and his gentle, loving heart have parted the clouds for countless troubled creatures. Buck is the Zen master of the horse world."

== Film ==
Robert Redford bought the film rights for £3 million, and the film The Horse Whisperer was released in 1998, with Redford himself in the title role as Tom Booker and Scarlett Johansson as Grace MacLean.

The film is mostly faithful to the book but does not include Grace's confrontation with the herd of Mustangs, nor the death of Booker. Instead, Annie drives away from the ranch with Pilgrim in the trailer while Booker watches from the top of a hill. There is no indication in the movie that Annie and Tom sexually consummated their affair.

== See also ==
- John Solomon Rarey, early nineteenth century horse whisperer whose techniques were shown in the book
