= Daniel "Horse-Whisperer" Sullivan =

Daniel Sullivan (died 1810) from Mallow, Co. Cork, Ireland, was an Irish horse trainer who specialised in rehabilitation of horses that were unresponsive to traditional methods. A large portion of his work took place in England.

Not very much is known about him, since he was secretive about his actual methods. To the people who were able to watch him at work, he appeared to frequently stand so close to the horse that they assumed he was whispering to it. For that reason he became known as the "horse whisperer."

Hope of rediscovering Daniel Sullivan's secret method inspired the American, Willis J. Powell, who wrote about his own actual practices.
