= J. Dallett Byers =

American jockey and racehorse trainer

Personal information
- Born: January 20, 1898 Sugartown, Pennsylvania
- Died: December 23, 1966 (aged 68) Augusta, Georgia
- Occupation: Jockey

Horse racing career
- Sport: Horse racing

Honours
- National Museum of Racing and Hall of Fame (1967)

J. Dallett Byers (January 20, 1898 – December 23, 1966) was an American jockey and Thoroughbred racehorse trainer. He was inducted into the National Museum of Racing and Hall of Fame in 1967.
