= Louie Dingwall =

British racehorse trainer (1893–1982)

Louie Dingwall (née Louisa Foott) (1893–1982) was one of the first English female racehorse trainers.

During World War I Dingwall worked as a driver for the Canadian Army who were in Britain preparing to enter hostilities in France. She owned a Model T Ford, possibly a gift from the Canadians, when she moved to Sandbanks in Dorset after the war. At first she lived in a sea-side hut but by hard work moved to a bungalow on Panorama Road.

She built stables and a garage with a petrol pump in a shed close by from where she ran a taxi business with her husband and an independent bus service in the Poole area until the outbreak of war in 1939 when she provided transport for officers stationed in the area. She trained horses on the beach at Sandbanks, though her husband owned the licence for the Jockey Club, who looked unfavourably on women licensees.
