= Chris Cox (horse trainer) =

American horse trainer

Chris Cox is an American horse trainer. He has won the Road to the Horse competition four times and gives clinics in the United States.

== Life ==
Cox was born in Kissimmee, Florida, United States, and moved to Australia with his family at age one. In Australia, he lived on a large cattle ranch, before returning to the U.S. as an adult. Cox now lives on a ranch near Mineral Wells, Texas.

== Career ==
Cox began training horses at age seven. As an adult, he has trained mustangs for the Bureau of Land Management. He gives clinics in the United States and has competed in cutting horse competitions. He has won Road to the Horse four times, making him the only trainer to do so. He won it in 2007, 2008, 2011, and 2015. The Texas Cowboy Hall of Fame inducted him in 2015.
