= Tom and Bill Dorrance =

Brothers and horsemen William Dorrance (January 19, 1906 – July 20, 1999) and Tom Dorrance (May 11, 1910 – June 11, 2003) are considered among the founders of the modern natural horsemanship movement. Born and raised on an Oregon cattle ranch with a background in the Great Basin "Buckaroo" tradition, they promoted natural, gentle methods of horse training, emphasizing "feel" of the horse and observation of its responses to the handler.

They had a particularly strong influence on fellow horseman Ray Hunt and Hunt's disciple, Buck Brannaman, as well as Arabian horse breeder and trainer Sheila Varian. Many horse trainers and owners claim influence from the Dorrance brothers, including Pat Parelli, famous for his video series of games to play through groundwork.

The Dorrance brothers' influence travelled widely throughout the United States, particularly among cattlemen and cowboys who worked with horses every day. Having a relationship to their horses was far more important than winning awards or accolades in the show ring, and so horsemanship, the relationship between equine and human, was more important than the colour of their ribbon. The writings of the Dorrance brothers, in terms of horsemanship, is not divergent from those of other great horsemen such as Nuno Oliveira or François Robichon de La Guérinière.

When people think of natural horsemanship that could mean a lot of things. It isn't natural for a horse to be around people, and it's not natural for a person to be sitting on him either. When we use these words we speak about what's natural for the horse to do within his own boundaries.

— Bill Dorrance, True Horsemanship Through Feel

It has often been said that the Dorrances could see what a horse was thinking before the horse even thought it. Tom Dorrance has frequently been quoted as positing his question "what happened, before what happened happened?". Bill Dorrance, aside from his horsemanship skills was renowned as a rawhide braider and roper. Martin Black, a world famous horseman and clinician, often cites his experiences with Tom Dorrance and his regrets at not having studied more carefully while under Tom's tutelage. Martin can be seen featured in the video "Through the Coral Fence".

The thing you are trying to help the horse do is to use his own mind. You are trying to present something and then let him figure out how to get there.

— Tom Dorrance, True Unity: Willing Communication Between Horse and Human

== See also ==
- Horse whisperer
- Horse training
- Horse behavior

== Sources ==
- True Horsemanship Through Feel by Bill Dorrance and Leslie Desmond. ISBN 1-59921-056-8
- True Unity, by Tom Dorrance. First Edition, Word Dancer Press, 1987. ISBN 1-884995-09-8
- The Revolution In Horsemanship by Dr Robert Miller et al. ISBN 1-59228-387-X
- Death of a Legendary Horseman, Bill Dorrance obituary, New York Times, July 24, 1999
