= Buck Brannaman =

American horse trainer

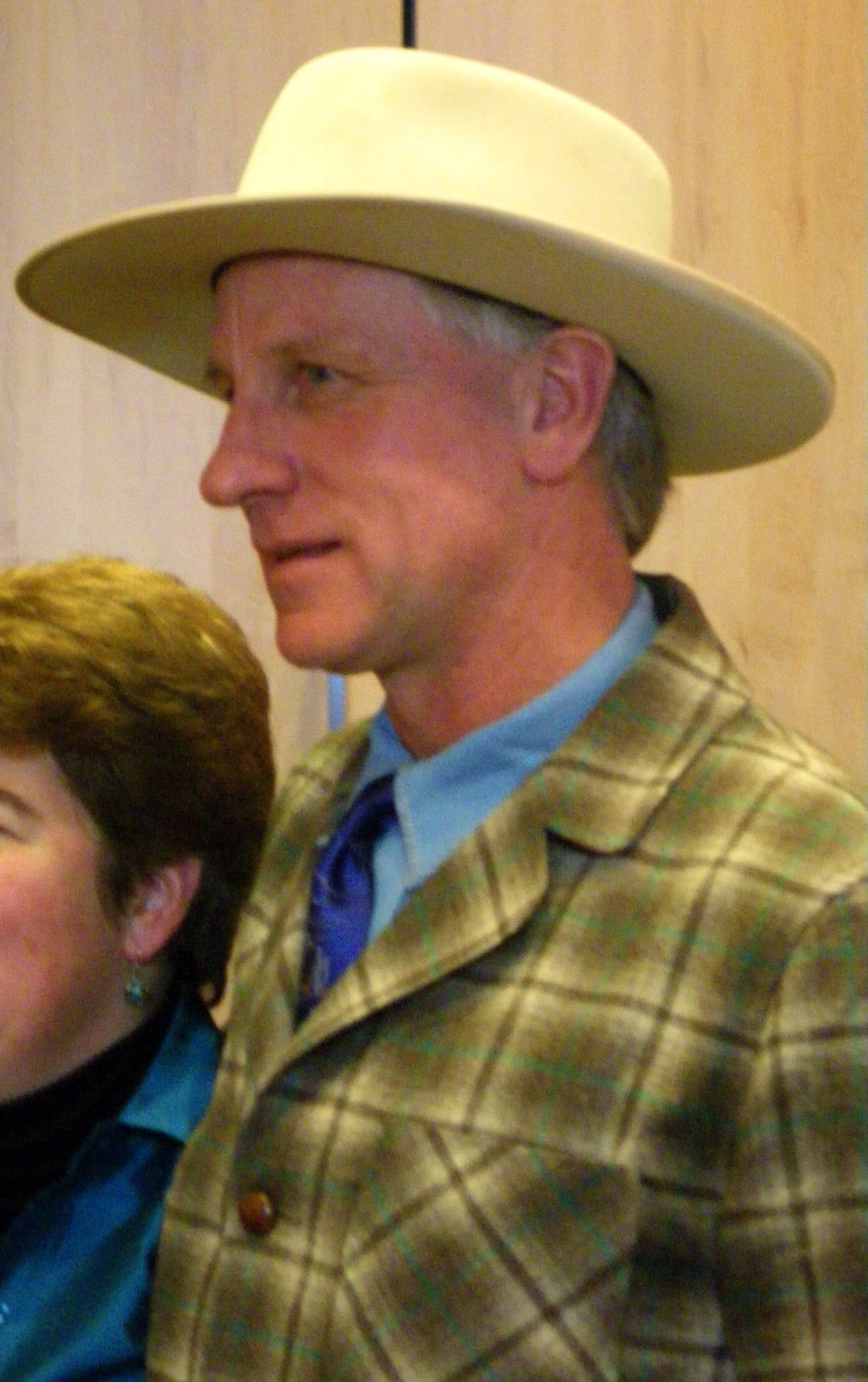
Buck Brannaman at the 2011 Sundance Film Festival.

Dan M. "Buck" Brannaman (born January 29, 1962) is an American horse trainer and a leading clinician with a philosophy of handling horses based on classical concepts from the vaquero tradition; working with the horse's nature, using an understanding of how horses think and communicate to train the horse to accept humans and work confidently and responsively with them.

One of Brannaman's stated goals is to make the animal feel safe and secure around humans so that the horse and rider can achieve a true union.

== Early life and career ==
Brannaman was born in 1962 in Sheboygan, Wisconsin, and raised in Montana and Idaho. Brannaman was for many years a disciple of Ray Hunt, one of the founders of the natural horsemanship movement, and also inspired by Tom and Bill Dorrance. Brannaman now teaches clinics worldwide. About the clinics, he has noted, "the goal for clinics really is to just try to get the human being to understand as much about their horse as I can help them to understand."

Brannaman had a difficult childhood, characterized by considerable child abuse at the hands of his father, to the extent that he and his brother spent a number of years in foster care placement. He took solace in horses, and learned from his own experiences, to look at a situation from the point of view of the horse. Brannaman has written:

"I've started horses since I was 12 years old and have been bit, kicked, bucked off and run over. I've tried every physical means to contain my horse in an effort to keep from getting myself killed. I started to realize that things would come much easier for me once I learned why a horse does what he does."

He later used these experiences in his career as a horse trainer, recognizing in difficult animals the same fear and hostile reactions he remembered from his own childhood:

"Abused horses are like abused children. They trust no one and expect the worst. But patience, leadership, compassion and firmness can help them overcome their pasts."

In recent years, he has become a motivational speaker for groups outside of the horse world, frequently describing the connection between animal abuse and abuse of children and other human beings. "For me, these principles are really about life," says Brannaman, "about living your life so that you're not making war with the horse, or with other people."

Brannaman is also a skilled trick roper, having performed rope tricks in television commercials since he was six years old. For his roping abilities, Brannaman also holds two spots in the Guinness Book of World Records. Though Brannaman has said, "my dad gave us the choice of practicing roping tricks or getting whipped," he still takes pride in his skill, offers roping and cattle working clinics, and retains a close connection to the historic vaquero cowboy tradition of the western United States.

== Recent life and career ==
Brannaman was one of the primary individuals who inspired the character of "Tom Booker" in the Nicholas Evans novel The Horse Whisperer, and was the lead equine consultant for the film of the same name. Though the book itself was a work of fiction, Evans himself said:

"Others have falsely claimed to be the inspiration for Tom Booker in The Horse Whisperer. The one who truly inspired me was Buck Brannaman. His skill, understanding and his gentle, loving heart have parted the clouds for countless troubled creatures. Buck is the Zen master of the horse world." –Nicholas Evans

The publicity from the book and movie, along with Brannaman's approach to treating troubled horses and troubled humans with equal doses of compassion, has helped promote other fields such as therapeutic horseback riding. In that context, Brannaman has noted, "Horses are incredibly forgiving. They fill in places we're not capable of filling ourselves. They've given people a new hope, a new lease on life. A horse really wants to please you, to get along." Brannaman lives with his wife, Mary, in Sheridan, Wyoming. He has three daughters.

A documentary about Brannaman called Buck, directed by Cindy Meehl, won the U.S. Documentary Competition Audience Award at the 2011 Sundance Film Festival. It was purchased by IFC Films under their Sundance Selections label.

Further to the documentary "Buck" a series of DVDs has been produced entitled "7 Clinics" which together with his earlier DVD series creates a comprehensive library of his horsemanship.

== Published works ==
- Brannaman, Buck. Groundwork: The First Impression. Rancho Deluxe Design, 1997. ISBN 0-9657657-0-9.
- Mangum, A.J. Ranch Roping with Buck Brannaman : A practical guide to traditional roping. Western Horseman Books, 2002. ISBN 0-911647-54-6, ISBN 978-0-911647-54-9.
- Brannaman, Buck (with William Reynolds). The Faraway Horses. Lyons Press, 2001. ISBN 1-58574-352-6.
- Brannaman, Buck and William Reynolds. Believe: A Horseman's Journey. Lyons Press, 2006. ISBN 1-59228-899-5, ISBN 978-1-59228-899-1.

== Sources ==
- Miller, Robert and Richard Lamb. Revolution in Horsemanship. Lyons Press, 2005. ISBN 1-59228-387-X.
