= Rarey technique =

Horse-calming method

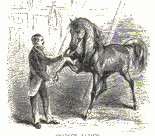
John Rarey and Cruiser, illustration from The Complete Horse Tamer by John Rarey, (1860)

The Rarey technique is a method of calming horses that have become vicious and fearful of humans due to abusive handling or other traumatic events. It is named for its inventor, John Solomon Rarey (1827–1866) of Groveport, Ohio, USA, who became famous for taming violent horses with it, and later for teaching it in various countries around the world.

== The technique ==
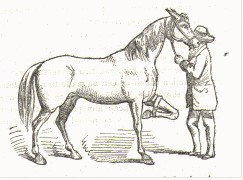
Illustrations from The Complete Horse Tamer by John Rarey, (1860)

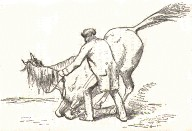

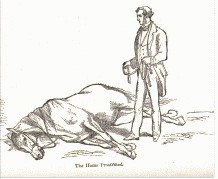

Rarey began by tying one of the traumatized horse's legs with a strap so that the horse could not stand on it. This gave him control over the horse and quickly tired the animal out. Then, Rarey would gently but firmly cause the horse to lie down on a comfortable surface. Once the horse was lying on its side, Rarey could use his weight, concentrated at a strategic point, to keep the horse from rising. While the horse was thus unable to protect itself, Rarey showed it that it was still entirely safe with him by touching and stroking it on all parts of its body. The result was that the horse learned that it could be entirely safe in Rarey's company, and from that beginning it was relatively easy to demonstrate to the horse that it did not need to protect itself from most other humans.

== See also ==
- The Modern Art of Taming Wild Horses, the booklet of Rarey hosted into wikisource
- Horse breaking
- Horseman's Word
