= Granny McDonald =

New Zealand racehorse trainer

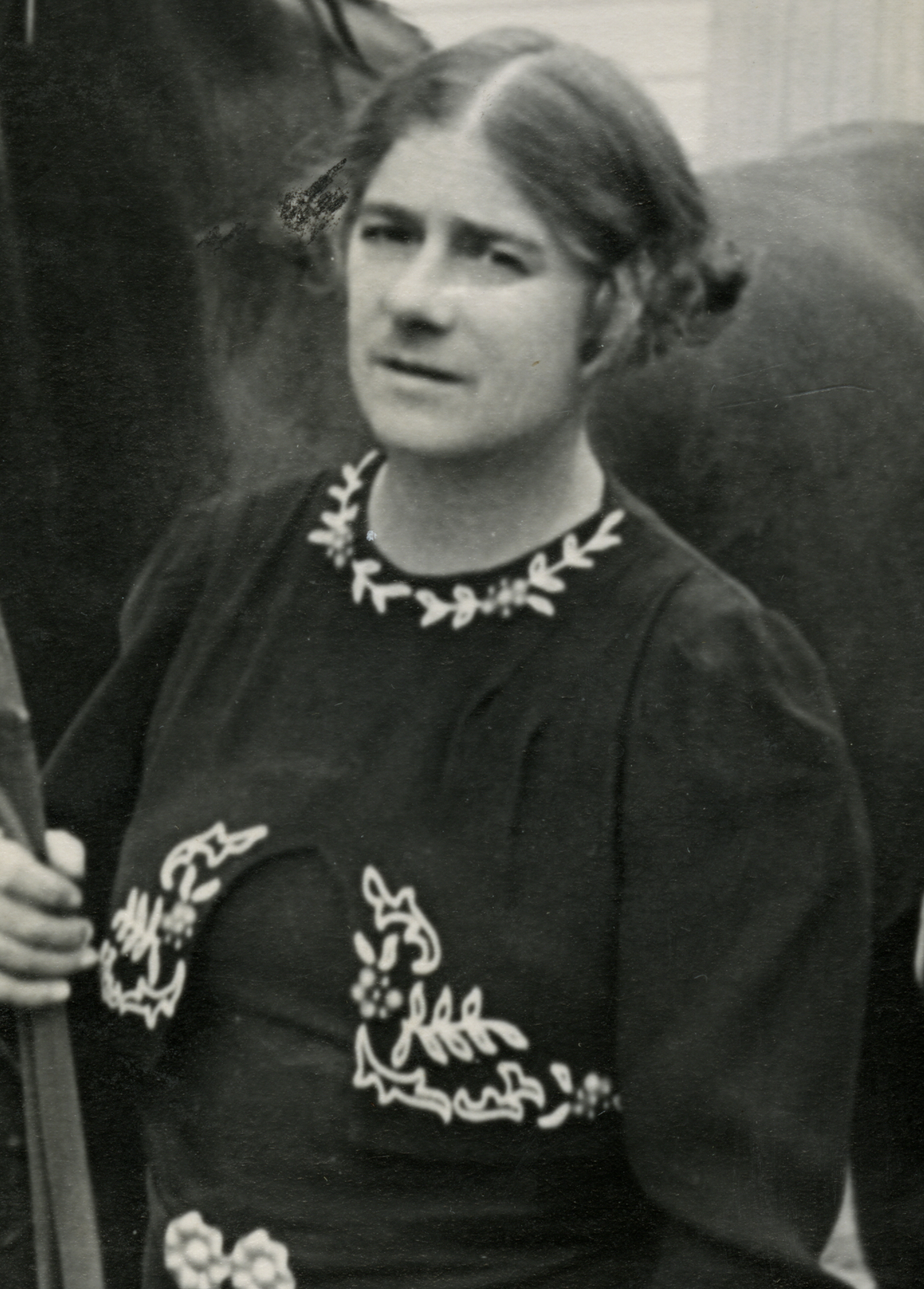
- McDonald in the 1930s
- Full name: Hedwick Wilhelmina McDonald
- Occupation: Racehorse trainer
- Born: 28 April 1893; Hastings, New Zealand
- Died: 5 October 1959 (aged 66); Palmerston North, New Zealand

Hedwick Wilhelmina "Granny" McDonald (28 April 1893 – 5 October 1959) was a New Zealand racehorse trainer. She was born in Hastings, Hawke's Bay, New Zealand on 28 April 1893.

She was the trainer of the 1938 Melbourne Cup winner Catalogue. Whilst she was a registered horse trainer in New Zealand, women were not then allowed to register as horse trainers in Australia. Thus, Catalogue was entered into the Melbourne Cup with Hedwick's husband Allan as the official registered trainer.
