= Caroll K. Bassett =

American jockey

Personal information
- Born: 1905
- Died: March 24, 1972 (aged 66–67) Gordonsville, Virginia
- Occupation: Jockey

Horse racing career
- Sport: Horse racing

Honors
- National Museum of Racing and Hall of Fame (1972)

Caroll K. Bassett (1905 – March 24, 1972) was an American jockey. He was inducted into the National Museum of Racing and Hall of Fame in 1972.

He died on March 24, 1972, in Gordonsville, Virginia at age 66.
