= Craig Cameron (horse trainer) =

American horse trainer

Craig Cameron (born 1949) is an American horse trainer.

== Life ==
Cameron was born in 1949 in Texas and grew up on a ranch. He currently lives in Bluff Dale, Texas, with his wife.

== Career ==
Cameron competed in rodeo for many years. He rode at the Professional Rodeo Cowboys Association level and specialized in bull riding. Cameron later began training horses and giving clinics on reining, training young horses and Western riding. He also founded the Extreme Cowboy Race and hosts a program on RFD-TV. In 2010, Cameron won the Road to the Horse competition.

== Honors ==
In 2007, Cameron was inducted into the Texas Cowboy Hall of Fame.

In 2024, he was inducted into the All Cowboy & Arena Champions Hall of Fame.
