= Road to the Horse =

Annual colt-starting competition

The Road to the Horse is an annual colt-starting competition held at the Alltech Arena in the Kentucky Horse Park in Lexington, Kentucky. Three trainers are invited to choose a colt from a remuda of untouched three-year old quarter horses provided by the American Quarter Horse Association. They then have a specified amount of time over three days to gently get a saddle and tack on the colt and ride it. Road to the Horse is owned and produced by Tootie Bland. In the past, the competition has been held at Cowtown Coliseum in Fort Worth, Texas and Tennessee Miller Coliseum in Murfreesboro, Tennessee.

== Winners ==
Road to the Horse winners
Year	Trainer	Horse
2003	(Australia) Clinton Anderson	Hancock Sug
2005	(Australia) Clinton Anderson	
2006	(United States) Stacy Westfall	Doctor T Tari
2007	(United States) Chris Cox	
2008	(United States) Chris Cox	
2009	(United States) Richard Winters	
2010	(United States) Craig Cameron	
2011	(United States) Chris Cox	
2012	(Australia) Guy McLean (Australia) Dan James	
2013	(Australia) Guy McLean	
2014	(Canada) Jim Anderson	Speedy Cream
2015	(United States) Chris Cox	
2016	(United States) Nick Dowers	
2017	(New Zealand) Vicki Wilson	Boon River Lad 'Kentucky'
2018	(New Zealand) Vicki Wilson	Wyoming Pick | Crowns Lad
2019	(United States) Nick Dowers	
2021	(United States) Wade Black	
2022	(United States) Mike Major	Yellowhouse Canyon
2023	(United States) Mike Major	
2024	(Canada) Tik Maynard	
2025	(Canada) Tik Maynard	Goodluck Suncat
