= Nicholas Evans =

British writer and film producer (1950–2022)

- Born: Nicholas Benbow Evans; 26 July 1950; Bromsgrove, Worcestershire, England
- Died: 9 August 2022 (aged 72); London, England (Note: Media sources differed on whether he died in London or in Totnes, Devon, but public records show that his death was registered in the London Borough of Wandsworth.)
- Education: St Edmund Hall, Oxford
- Occupations: Novelist; journalist; screenwriter; producer
- Spouses: Jenny Lyon (m. 1973, divorced): Charlotte Gordon Cumming
- Children: 4
- Writing career
- Genres: Fantasy; mystery
- Notable work: The Horse Whisperer

Nicholas Benbow Evans (26 July 1950 – 9 August 2022) was a British journalist, screenwriter, television and film producer and novelist. He was best known for his 1995 debut novel, The Horse Whisperer. It has sold over fifteen million copies, and has been adapted into a film.

== Biography ==
Nicholas Benbow Evans was born in Bromsgrove, Worcestershire, son of Anthony Evans, director of a motor engineering company, and Eileen, née Whitehouse. He was educated at Bromsgrove School, where he was head boy. He served as a teacher in Senegal with the charity Voluntary Service Overseas for a year, after which he earned a first in law at St. Edmund Hall, Oxford. Following graduation he worked as a reporter for the Newcastle-upon-Tyne Evening Chronicle before moving to London Weekend Television where he worked on Weekend World and The London Programme and was executive producer of The South Bank Show from 1982 to 1984. During this time he also wrote and adapted screenplays for television broadcast.

He tried to enter into film producing in the early 1990s, but his efforts did not come to fruition, and The New York Times described him as "broke and adrift" at that stage in his life; he had also been diagnosed with melanoma, though he would recover. But during this time, he heard from a friend a "story that made me shiver": a "horse whisperer" in southwest England who could heal and soothe horses. £60,000 in debt, he decided to write the story as a novel as opposed to a screenplay, having felt burned by his previous attempts to mount his own film. In the course of research, he travelled to the U.S. states of Montana, New Mexico, and California. The rights for his novel were sold by his agent and friend Caradoc King for US$3 million at the 1994 Frankfurt Book Fair.

His debut novel The Horse Whisperer was No. 10 on the list of bestselling novels in the United States for 1995 as determined by The New York Times. With 15 million copies sold, it is on the list of the best-selling books of all time. In the UK, The Horse Whisperer was listed at 195 on the BBC's Big Read, a 2003 survey with the goal of finding the "nation's best-loved book". It was made into a film in 1998; Robert Redford directed, and he starred opposite Kristin Scott Thomas, along with Scarlett Johansson and Sam Neill.

Evans revealed on his personal website that he agreed to an option to make a film of his third novel, The Smoke Jumper.

== Personal life and death ==
Evans married Oxford classmate Jenny Lyon in 1973; they had two children and divorced in the 1990s. He then married singer-songwriter Charlotte Gordon Cumming. They had one child, and he also had a child from a relationship with television producer Jane Hewland.

Evans, Cumming and several of their relatives were poisoned in September 2008 after mistakenly consuming deadly webcap mushrooms that they gathered on holiday in Morayshire. They all had to undergo kidney dialysis, and Evans underwent a transplant in 2011 using a kidney donated by his daughter.

Evans died from a heart attack at his home in London on 9 August 2022, aged 72.

== Works ==
- The Horse Whisperer (1995)
- The Loop (1998)
- The Smoke Jumper (2001)
- The Divide (2005)
- The Brave (2010)
