= Ray Hunt (horse trainer) =

Horse trainer (1929–2009)

Ray Hunt (August 31, 1929 – March 12, 2009) was an American horse trainer and clinician of significant influence in the natural horsemanship field. He had chronic obstructive pulmonary disease.

== Natural horsemanship ==
Hunt is widely regarded as one of the original proponents of what became known as natural horsemanship. His views on horse-human relations were embraced by inspirational writers on human relations. Lance Secretan wrote, "We may respect a leader, but the ones we love are servant-leaders." In the beginning, Hunt said, "I was working in the mind of a lot of people who didn't want to believe the horse had a mind. Get a bigger bit. Get a bigger stick. That was their approach."

Ray Hunt is said to be Tom Dorrance's best-known student. They met around 1960, at a fair in Elko, Nevada. While Dorrance avoided media attention and clinics, by the mid-1970s, Hunt was giving clinics far and wide. Ray Hunt is famous for starting each clinic with the statement, "I'm here for the horse, to help him get a better deal." He also liked to say, "Make the wrong thing difficult and the right thing easy." His philosophy has been interpreted as, "If you get bucked off or kicked or bitten, you obviously did something wrong... The horse, on the other hand, is never wrong."

The idea that "the horse is never wrong" is often misunderstood by people who think Ray was talking about the horse's behaviour, he was rather meaning the horse's reaction to human behaviour. The horse always interprets human actions in the moment, they don't think about the past or future in the way that people do. So, their reactions to what is happening in the moment is always pure, they reflect what the human did with the utmost integrity. If we want to change the horse, we should first change ourselves. As Ray said "it's easy to change the horse, but it's hard to change the human".

Ray Hunt was a mentor and teacher of Buck Brannaman.

== Works ==
- 1978 Think Harmony with Horses: An In-depth Study of Horse/man Relationship
- 1992 Turning loose with Ray Hunt (video)
- 1996 Colt starting with Ray Hunt (video)
- 2001 The Fort Worth Benefit with Ray Hunt (video)
- Back To The Beginning (video)
- Ray Hunt Appreciation Clinic: 2005 Western Horseman of the Year (video)
- Ray Hunt: Cowboy Logic

== See also ==
- Tom and Bill Dorrance
