= John Solomon Rarey =

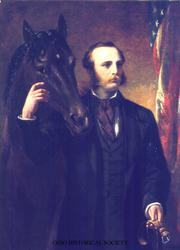
John S. Rarey with his horse Cruiser, painted by M. Kellogg, 1860

John Solomon Rarey (1827–1866) was a nineteenth-century horse whisperer, an important figure in the rehabilitation of abused and vicious horses during the 1850s. Originally from Groveport, Ohio, Rarey trained his first horse at the age of twelve. (His method of rehabilitating horses is discussed in the article entitled Rarey technique.)

An excerpt from The Horse Whisperer by Nicholas Evans:

Word of his gift spread and in 1858 he was summoned to Windsor Castle in England to calm a horse of Queen Victoria. The Queen and her entourage watched astonished as Rarey put his hands on the animal and laid it down on the ground before them. Then he lay down beside it and rested his head on its hooves. The queen chuckled with delight and gave Rarey a hundred dollars. He was a modest, quiet man, but now he was famous and the press wanted more. The call went out to find the most ferocious horse in all England.

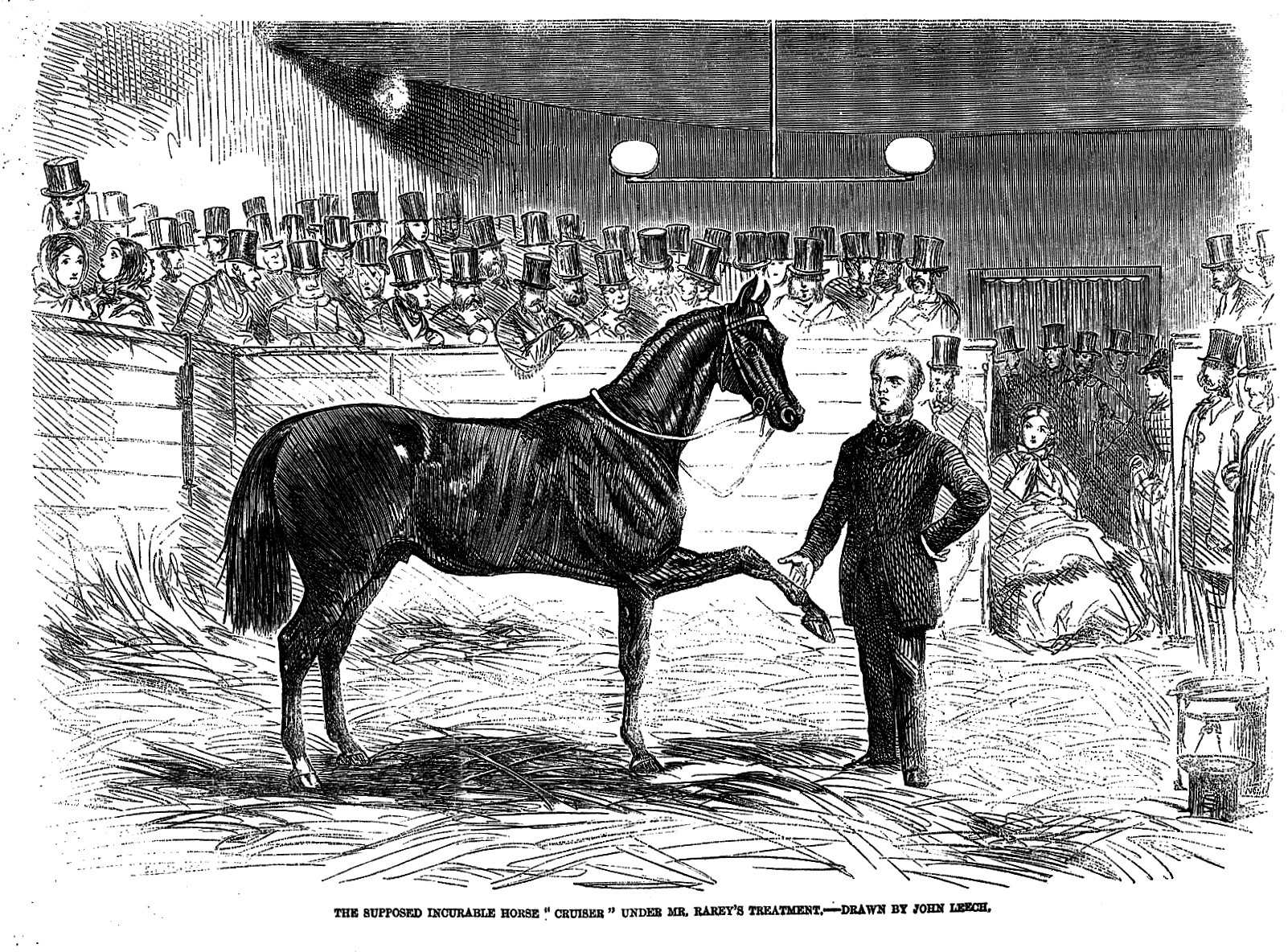
The supposed incurable horse Cruiser under Mr. Rarey's treatment

The horse they found was Cruiser, an animal kept for breeding but said to be the fiercest horse ever seen.

Nicholas Evans writes:

Against all advice, Rarey let himself into the stable where no one else dared venture and shut the door. He emerged three hours later leading Cruiser, without his muzzle and gentle as a lamb. The owners were so impressed they gave him the horse. Rarey brought him back to Ohio, where Cruiser died on July 6, 1875, outliving his new master by a full nine years. Rarey left instructions for the care of Cruiser in his will. Upon Rarey's death, Cruiser's temper returned.

Rarey used Cruiser in three well-attended public demonstrations of horse-taming in New York City in early January 1861.

== Works ==
- John Solomon Rarey, The Complete Horse Tamer, 1862.
