= Groveport, Ohio =

- City
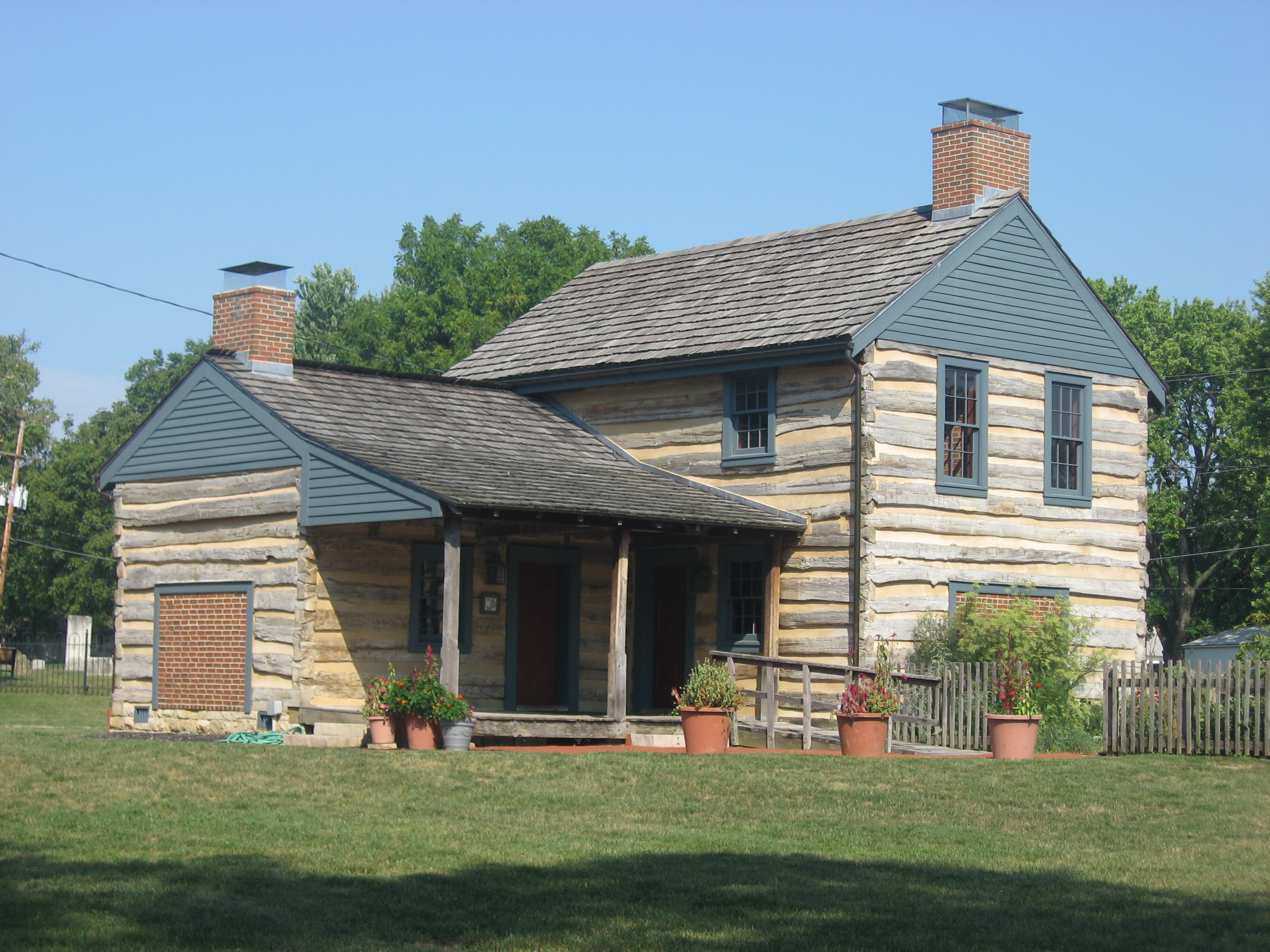
- One of the Groveport Log Houses

- Flag Seal
- Motto: "Central Ohio's Hometown"
- Interactive map of Groveport, Ohio
- Location within Ohio Location within the United States
- Coordinates: 39°52′00″N 82°53′30″W
- Country: United States
- State: Ohio
- County: Franklin
- Settled: March 1, 1803

Area
  - Total: 8.93 sq mi (23.14 km^{2})
  - Land: 8.71 sq mi (22.55 km^{2})
  - Water: 0.23 sq mi (0.59 km^{2})
- Elevation: 738 ft (225 m)

Population (2020)
  - Total: 6,009
  - Estimate (2023): 5,806
  - Rank: Ohio: 236th
  - Density: 690.1/sq mi (266.45/km^{2})
- Time zone: UTC-5 (Eastern (EST))
  - Summer (DST): UTC-4 (EDT)
- ZIP codes: 43125, 43195, 43196, 43198, 43199
- Area codes: 614 and 380
- FIPS code: 3932606
- GNIS feature ID: 2398213
- Nearby airports: Rickenbacker International Airport, John Glenn Columbus International Airport, Bolton Field
- Website: City of Groveport

Groveport is a city in Franklin County, Ohio, United States. It is a suburb of Columbus. The population was 6,009 at the 2020 census.

== History ==
Groveport had its start as a single entity in 1846 when the neighboring rival towns of Wert's Grove and Rarey's Port merged. These towns were located along the Ohio and Erie Canal. The city was incorporated as a village in 1847. A post office called Groveport has been in operation since 1847. The city is the location of the Groveport Log House, which was built in 1815 and moved in 1974 to a location near Groveport Cemetery.

== Geography ==
According to the United States Census Bureau, the city has a total area of 8.79 square miles (22.77 km^{2}), of which 8.56 square miles (22.17 km^{2}) is land and 0.23 square miles (0.60 km^{2}) is water.

== Demographics ==
Historical population
Census	Pop.	Note	%±
1850	483		—
1860	540		11.8%
1870	627		16.1%
1880	650		3.7%
1890	578		−11.1%
1900	519		−10.2%
1910	643		23.9%
1920	671		4.4%
1930	946		41.0%
1940	1,052		11.2%
1950	1,165		10.7%
1960	2,043		75.4%
1970	2,490		21.9%
1980	3,286		32.0%
1990	2,948		−10.3%
2000	3,865		31.1%
2010	5,363		38.8%
2020	6,009		12.0%
2023 (est.)	5,806		−3.4%

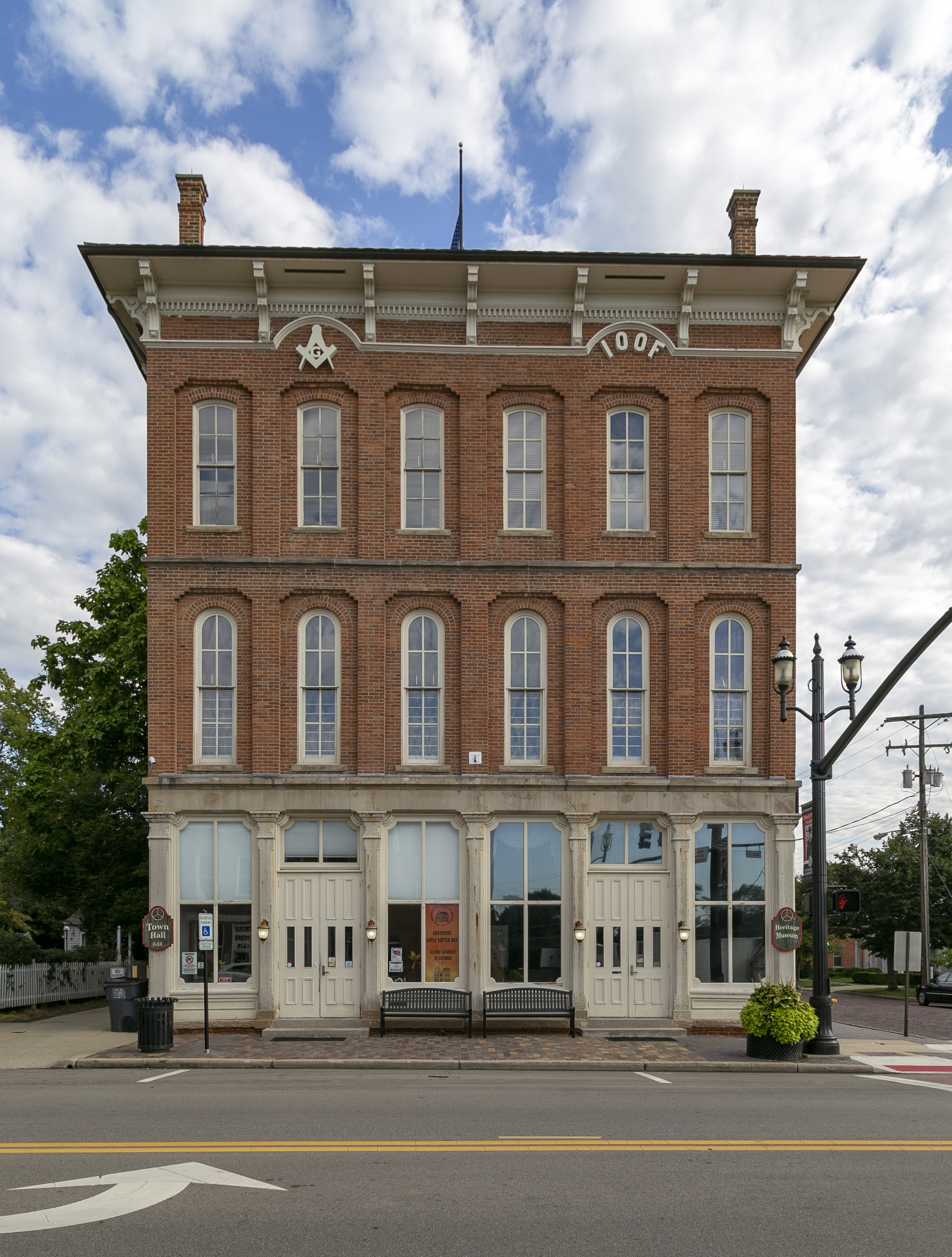
Groveport City Hall

=== 2020 census ===
As of the 2020 census, Groveport had a population of 6,009. The median age was 42.8 years; 20.1% of residents were under the age of 18 and 18.4% of residents were 65 years of age or older. For every 100 females there were 95.3 males, and for every 100 females age 18 and over there were 91.0 males age 18 and over.

99.7% of residents lived in urban areas, while 0.3% lived in rural areas.

There were 2,399 households in Groveport, of which 27.6% had children under the age of 18 living in them. Of all households, 50.1% were married-couple households, 16.4% were households with a male householder and no spouse or partner present, and 25.2% were households with a female householder and no spouse or partner present. About 27.0% of all households were made up of individuals and 12.4% had someone living alone who was 65 years of age or older.

There were 2,488 housing units, of which 3.6% were vacant. The homeowner vacancy rate was 0.7% and the rental vacancy rate was 5.4%.

Racial composition as of the 2020 census
Race	Number	Percent
White	4,208	70.0%
Black or African American	1,020	17.0%
American Indian and Alaska Native	16	0.3%
Asian	175	2.9%
Native Hawaiian and Other Pacific Islander	1	0.0%
Some other race	158	2.6%
Two or more races	431	7.2%
Hispanic or Latino (of any race)	281	4.7%

=== 2010 census ===
As of the census of 2010, there were 5,363 people, 2,099 households, and 1,471 families living in the village. The population density was 626.5 inhabitants per square mile (241.9/km^{2}). There were 2,300 housing units at an average density of 268.7 per square mile (103.7/km^{2}). The racial makeup of the village was 82.1% White, 12.5% African American, 0.3% Native American, 1.9% Asian, 1.0% from other races, and 2.3% from two or more races. Hispanic or Latino of any race were 2.2% of the population. 7.8% of residents were foreign born.

There were 2,099 households, of which 32.9% had children under the age of 18 living with them, 54.3% were married couples living together, 10.8% had a female householder with no husband present, 5.1% had a male householder with no wife present, and 29.9% were non-families. 24.6% of all households were made up of individuals, and 9.2% had someone living alone who was 65 years of age or older. The average household size was 2.56 and the average family size was 3.03.

The median age in the village was 39.9 years. 23.7% of residents were under the age of 18; 7.7% were between the ages of 18 and 24; 26.3% were from 25 to 44; 30% were from 45 to 64; and 12.5% were 65 years of age or older. The gender makeup of the village was 48.1% male and 51.9% female.

The number of veterans living in Groveport between 2015 and 2019 was 309.

Approximately 7.8% of Groveport residents are foreign-born.

=== 2000 census ===
As of the census of 2000, there were 3,865 people, 1,575 households, and 1,080 families living in the village. The population density was 482.9 inhabitants per square mile (186.4/km^{2}). There were 1,668 housing units at an average density of 208.4 per square mile (80.5/km^{2}). The racial makeup of the village was 92.88% White, 3.62% African American, 0.62% Native American, 1.09% Asian, 0.57% from other races, and 1.22% from two or more races. Hispanic or Latino of any race were 1.27% of the population.

There were 1,575 households, out of which 31.1% had children under the age of 18 living with them, 52.6% were married couples living together, 11.7% had a female householder with no husband present, and 31.4% were non-families. 26.0% of all households were made up of individuals, and 9.5% had someone living alone who was 65 years of age or older. The average household size was 2.45 and the average family size was 2.94.

In the village the population was spread out, with 24.0% under the age of 18, 8.4% from 18 to 24, 32.0% from 25 to 44, 23.5% from 45 to 64, and 12.1% who were 65 years of age or older. The median age was 37 years. For every 100 females, there were 92.5 males. For every 100 females age 18 and over, there were 89.8 males.

The median income for a household in the village was $43,102, and the median income for a family was $51,525. Males had a median income of $32,133 versus $27,353 for females. The per capita income for the village was $19,576. About 3.2% of families and 5.9% of the population were below the poverty line, including 9.1% of those under age 18 and 4.5% of those age 65 or over.

== Economy ==
Due in large part to the presence of Rickenbacker International Airport and Air National Guard Base, Groveport is home to many distribution centers and warehouses. The city used to be home to the headquarters of Air Tahoma before they ceased operations, and is currently home to the headquarters of Staber Industries. Other organizations with significant operations include Amazon.com, FedEx, Gap, Inc., Eddie Bauer, Spiegel Brands, American Electric Power and VistaPrint.

== Education ==
The Groveport Madison School District has 10 schools. There are six elementary schools, three middle schools, and the Groveport Madison High School. Groveport Madison athletes are known as the Cruisers.

== Notable people ==
- Le'Veon Bell, NFL All-Pro running back
- Thomas John Hennen, United States Army warrant officer and NASA astronaut
- Pam Higgins, three-time winner on the LPGA Tour
- John Solomon Rarey, horse whisperer, developed the Rarey technique
- Amor L. Sims, Brigadier general, USMC, during World War I and World War II
- Eric Smith, NFL safety
