= Natural horsemanship =

Collective term for a variety of horse training techniques

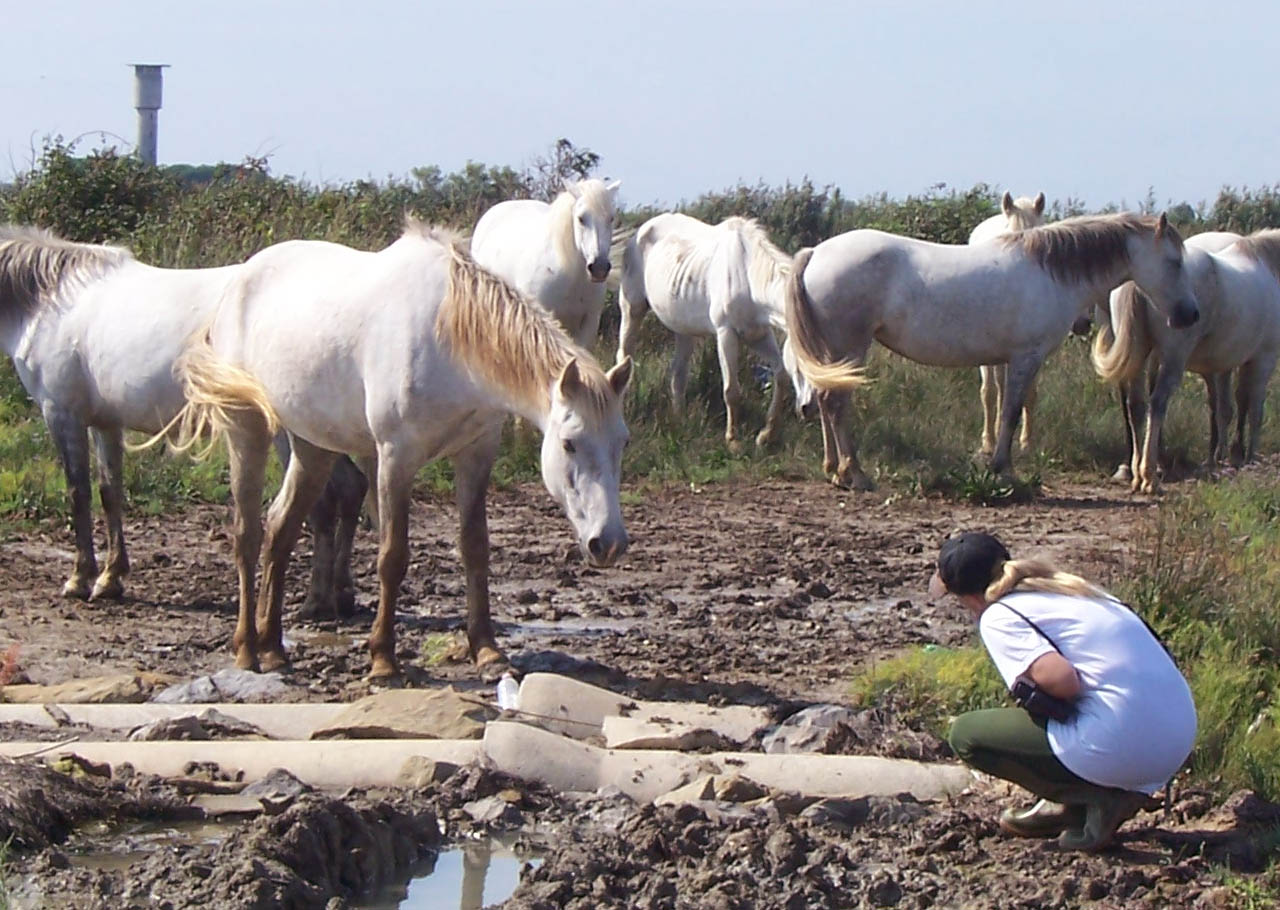
A human approaches a semi-wild horse in a non-threatening stance

Natural horsemanship is a collective term for a variety of horse training techniques which have seen rapid growth in popularity since the 1980s. The techniques vary in their precise tenets but generally share principles of "a kinder and gentler cowboy" to develop a rapport with horses, using methods said to be derived from observation of the natural behavior of free-roaming horses and rejecting abusive training methods.

Natural horsemanship practitioners often describe the approach as being a radical departure from "traditional" techniques, which are often portrayed as being based in the use of unnecessary force. Users and practitioners tend to relate benefits both in relation to the quasi-scientific narrative of the ethology of horse behavior, viewing the horse as "other", but also to the idea of an anthropomorphic partnership. High-profile practitioners of natural horsemanship such as Monty Roberts and Pat Parelli market their methods and equipment extensively through books, television appearances, live shows and other media. The natural horsemanship movement is controversial in the mainstream equestrian community, with criticism leveled at practitioners on a number of levels, while natural horsemanship advocates in turn are highly critical of more traditional methods. Natural horsemanship promoters face criticism that their techniques are not "new" and are classical concepts that are simply renamed or repackaged in order to be able to sell products and merchandise.

== History ==
The idea of working in sympathy with a horse in order to obtain a partnership is not new, with documented instances as far back as the two part treatise On Horsemanship by Xenophon (c. 430 – 354 BCE), which amongst other points, emphasized operant conditioning and emphasized reassurance over punishment. Later classical dressage practitioners such as Antoine de Pluvinel (1555–1620 CE) and François Robichon de La Guérinière (1688–1751) also emphasized gentle techniques. However, gentle training methods have always had to compete with harsher methods, which often appear to obtain faster, but less ethical results. In particular, the cowboy tradition of the American west, where the economics of needing to break large numbers of semi-feral horses in a short period of time led to the development of a number of harsh training methods that the natural horsemanship movement specifically has set out to replace.

The modern natural horsemanship movement, though not originally described as such, developed primarily in the United States Pacific Northwest and Rocky Mountain states, where the "buckaroo" or vaquero-style cowboy tradition was the strongest. Brothers Tom and Bill Dorrance were early modern practitioners, who had background in the Great Basin buckaroo tradition. They had a particularly strong influence on Ray Hunt, who in turn became a significant influence upon Buck Brannaman. Many practitioners claim influence from the Dorrance brothers and Hunt, some having trained directly with these individuals. Other practitioners, such as Pat Parelli, came from the rodeo world.

In Europe a number of variations are practiced that developed independently of the American model, influenced by Spanish or Hungarian horsemanship traditions as well as the teachings of Classical dressage. Some natural horsemanship training methods use positive reinforcement training, and/or work rooted in the use of human body language to communicate effectively to the horse.

The growth in the modern acceptance of the techniques (and the growth in marketing of them) has been increasing since the 1970s, with initial slow growth accelerating through the 1980s and 1990s.

== Nomenclature ==
The term "horse whispering" dates to nineteenth century Europe when an Irish horseman, Daniel "Horse-Whisperer" Sullivan (d. 1810), made a name for himself in England by rehabilitating horses that had become vicious and intractable due to abuse or accidental trauma. John Solomon Rarey, a nineteenth century American trainer, was summoned to Windsor Castle in 1852 by Queen Victoria to demonstrate his Rarey technique on her wildest horses. Some natural horsemanship practitioners do not use the term "horse whisperer" to describe themselves, and some horse trainers dislike the "horse whispering" moniker to the extent that they openly ask that the term not be applied to them.

"Natural horsemanship" is a more recent term, originating in the western United States, and not coming into popular use until around 1985. Its origin is widely attributed within the movement to Pat Parelli, who wrote a book using the phrase in the title. The term became linked to "horse whispering" in the 1990s, when the popularity of Nicholas Evans' book The Horse Whisperer, and the later Robert Redford film of the same name, promoted popular awareness of natural horsemanship. However, some trainers linked to the movement, such as Mark Rashid and Tom Moates, have stated their discomfort with the term "natural horsemanship."

The movement has led many people in the horse industry to question "traditional" practices and to look at learning theory and equitation science to better understand horse behavior.

Within the Natural Horsemanship movement, the phrases "traditional" or "traditional methods" generally refer to brutal methods of horse-breaking that trained horses by dominating the horse and breaking its spirit. Some of these techniques are attributable to simple human failings such as ignorance or machismo. Others were derived from certain types of military training that insisted upon complete submission and learned helplessness from the horse, with misbehavior attributed to deliberate acts by the horse instead of a reaction to pain or fear of the handler. Still others were attributed to equipment and methods used on rodeo horses in the speed events such as calf roping and barrel racing.

However, some practitioners of more classical training methods take issue with the characterization of "traditional" methods of training as "inhumane", noting that gentle techniques have always existed. Some natural horsemanship advocates acknowledge that there are "traditional" techniques that can be used in a humane manner, even suggesting that multiple styles can be used together in a complementary fashion.

== Common theories ==
Techniques and precise theories vary between practitioners of natural horsemanship, but the central theme is that they advocate training and handling techniques which they assert are kind and gentle. Part of the premise of natural horsemanship is that teaching through pain and fear does not result in the type of relationship that benefits both horse and handler.

Like almost all horse training, the principal teaching aid is the use of operant conditioning to reinforce desired behaviours. The most common conditioning method is the use of pressure and release, with physical pressure being applied until the horse complies, or tries to comply, at which point the pressure is released as a negative reinforcement to the action. Punishment by physical force is rarely used in natural horsemanship, and many practitioners caution against the misuse of aids such as whips.

Many techniques focus on the extensive use of ground handling to build rapport and mutual understanding with the horse. Methods include the use of leading and suppling exercises, and training the horse on a lunge line or loose lead in a round pen.

Most natural horsemanship practitioners advocate use of a type of rope halter that has a thinner noseband and heavy heel knot reminiscent of a bosal style hackamore for groundwork, and, for some, riding. Usually use of a 12 to 14 feet (3.7 to 4.3 m) lead rope is promoted, which doubles as a lead line and a short longe line. Some, though not all, practitioners work horses bridleless, or consider bridleless work to represent the culmination of their training. Once a horse is under saddle, most practitioners advocate use of either a loose-ring or a full cheek style snaffle bit, and rope reins that include slobber straps and a lead rope section on the left side characteristic of a hackamore's mecate, sometimes called a "McCarty outfit." All practitioners emphasize that communication should be possible through light or minimal rein contact with the horse's mouth, encouraging primary use of weight and leg aids. Natural horsemanship and riding disciplines that emphasize steady, light contact are not incompatible, however. One practitioner has suggested that use of a patented design of bitless bridle can create more effective control of the horse, and solve other problems related to bitting. However, the benefits of a bitless bridle have been questioned in light of recent studies showing that the cross-under design puts significant pressure on the poll and under the chin, while soft tissues such as the tongue are actually better suited to handling pressure from a rider's hands than hard tissues like the nose bone and the palate, though bitless designs may still be suitable for horses with mouth injuries.

== Efficacy ==
A 2009 small-scale study of the efficacy of natural horsemanship techniques compared to "traditional" exercises indicated that natural horsemanship exercises could be more efficient at improving the human–horse relationship and reduce stress on the horse during training without compromising technical performance. A 2012 study, however, questioned some types of round pen training on the grounds that pressure-release methods do not enhance horse-human interaction (as remote-controlled cars were used to elicit similar responses) but actually control the horse through fear and for that reason may be less humane than originally thought.

== Criticism ==
The natural horsemanship movement has been criticized from a number of angles. The first criticism is that claims of natural horsemanship being something new and different are wholly unfounded, that similar methods have been around for a very long time. Some practitioners, particularly in classical dressage and other English riding disciplines, consider much of the movement to simply be the application of humane methods of classical horsemanship that have been practiced for centuries. However, many natural horsemanship practitioners acknowledge that they did not invent natural horsemanship and credit earlier work in humane horse-handling techniques.

Another common concern is that the movement has been promoted with too much hype and marketing. In particular, there are concerns that stories of near-miraculous results can mislead beginners to believe that they can accomplish miracles with their horses with little effort, education, or experience in horse training. A related concern is that practitioners rename common pieces of horse equipment and then sell their branded versions for premium prices. Some trainers view the use of particular brands or styles of common equipment as having more to do with personal preference than anything else. Others view certain tools as unneeded or prone to misuse. Practitioners counter that the equipment that they sell, such as rigid sticks and yachting-braid rope, have distinct characteristics that lend themselves to natural horsemanship training.

In particular, the characterization of traditional methods of training as inhumane does not accurately describe classic training methods. Though some critics acknowledge that some historical techniques were not always gentle, they point out that gentle techniques have always existed as well. Others express concern that natural horsemanship fails as a complete method of horse training.

Other trainers point out that the very act of catching and training horses is not "natural" at all, that nothing people do with horses is actually "natural" to the horse. Other authors such as Lawrence Scanlan suggest that "Domestication [of the horse] was a natural consequence... for those.. who were more curious, less territorial, less aggressive, more dependent [and] better able to deflect human aggression through submission".

Overuse of negative reinforcement in any training method to increase rates of desired behaviors can produce anxiety and stress in the horse until the aversive stimulus or "pressure" is released. Failure of the horse to emit the desired behavior, or failure of the trainer to relieve the pressure after a correct performance, will only prolong this stress.

== See also ==
- Domestication of the horse
- The Horseman's Word
- Rarey technique
- Equine ethics

== Sources ==
- Dr. Robert M. & Rick Lamb (2005). The Revolution in Horsemanship. Globe Pequot. pp. 35–40. ISBN 978-1-59228-387-3.
