= Horse trainer =

Person training horses for racing, riding, show or work

A horse trainer at a Texas ranch

A horse trainer is a person who tends to horses and teaches them different disciplines. Some responsibilities trainers have are caring for the animals' physical needs, as well as teaching them good behaviors and/or coaching them for events, which may include contests and other riding purposes. The level of education and the yearly salary they can earn for this profession may differ depending on where the person is employed.

== History ==
Horse domestication by the Botai culture in Kazakhstan dates to about 3500 BC. Written records of horse training as a pursuit has been documented as early as 1350 BC, by Kikkuli, the Hurrian "master horse trainer" of the Hittite Empire. Another source of early recorded history of horse training as a discipline comes from the Greek writer Xenophon, in his treatise On Horsemanship. Writing circa 350 BC, Xenophon addressed starting young horses, selecting older animals, and proper grooming and bridling. He discussed different approaches to spirited and dull horses and how to deal with vices. His approach is credited as the first known method of training horses through a sympathetic approach, wherein the trainer attempts to understand the natural instincts of the horse and build a relationship.

== Responsibilities ==
In horse racing, a trainer prepares a horse for races, with responsibility for exercising it, getting it race-ready and determining which races it should enter. Leading horse trainers can earn a great deal of money from a percentage of the winnings that they charge the owner for training the horse.

Outside horse racing, most trainers specialize in a certain equestrianism discipline, such as show jumping, reining, rodeo, sport horse disciplines, training of a specific horse breed, starting young horses, or working with problem horses. There are a wide variety of horse training methods used to teach the horse to do the things humans want them to do. Some fields can be very lucrative, usually depending on the value of the horses once trained or prize money available in competition. As a rule, most horse trainers earn at best a modest income which often requires supplementation from a second job or additional horse-related business, such as horse boarding or riding lessons.

Horse trainers are typically deemed to have the status of agents for the horse owners. As such, they have legal obligations to their owners, as well as authority to represent and even bind their owners to certain transactions.

== Education and training ==
Graduation from some form of secondary school, which is usually mandatory to become an animal trainer, is one of the qualifications a horse trainer may need. While this is a requirement for some employers, others may only require that horse trainers learn as they go along. Beginners in horse training can learn more about the subject at a college institution, which can be beneficial for their profession, but it is not always mandatory for horse trainers. Apprenticeship is also another option if a person wants to gain more knowledge about the profession.

When starting out in the profession, a horse trainer may not be given the assignments of a more learned and seasoned trainer until they gain more maturity in the job. Or, prior to their employment, they can learn and develop their skills elsewhere.

A horse trainer may also need to acquire a license in order to train.

== Salary ==
The earnings of horse trainers may be different depending on the country and the place of employment. According to the United States Department of Labor, "The median annual wage for animal trainers was $25,270 in May 2012. The lowest 10 percent earned less than $17,580, and the top 10 percent earned more than $49,840." The Government of Western Australia Department of Training and Workforce Development, in their section about horse trainers, state that $43,399 may be the standard yearly wages in Western Australia. Racehorse trainers in the UK can earn up to a standard yearly amount of £45,000, depending on the level of expertise a person possesses.

For independent horse trainers, their status, and the amount of work they do can influence the salary.

"Race winnings" can also provide a trainer with additional money.

== Controversies ==
Drug usage in horses has been a disputed topic in the field of equine. The acceptable purpose of drugs in this area is to reduce the suffering of injuries in racehorses, but sometimes drugs are used unlawfully to get an advantage over other horses, which can result in penalties for the horse trainer in question. With the numerous weekly deaths of racehorses, drugs are a disputed cause of death in horses. The intoxication of horses is concerning to some people, such as veterinarians and legislators. Some trainers defend drugs, implying that they are not the causes of the deaths. Some trainers also deny that they use drugs for unlawful purposes, sometimes because of their respect for horses.

== See also ==
- List of race horse trainers
- Horse training
- Horse racing
- Horse show
