= Riding hall =

Building used for indoor horseback riding

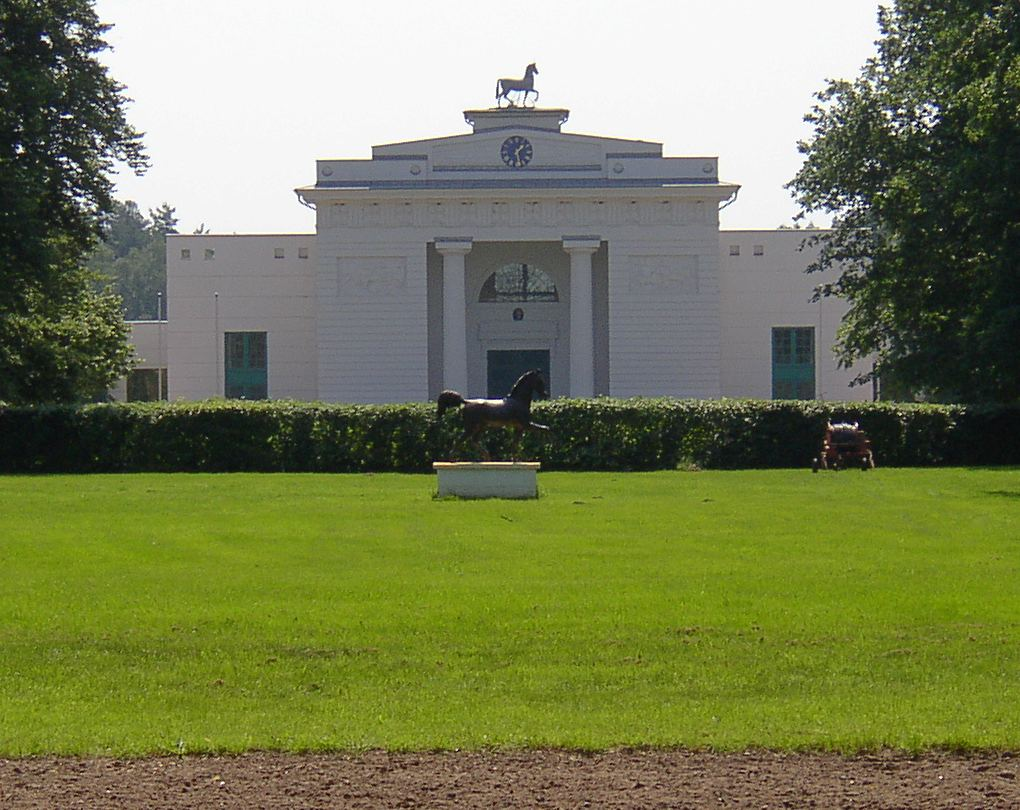
Riding hall of the Redefin State Stud

A riding hall, indoor arena, indoor school (UK English), or indoor ring (US English) is a building (part of an equestrian facility) that is specially designed for indoor horse riding. Smaller, private buildings contain only space for riding, while larger commercial facilities contain a "ring" or "arena" within a larger building as exclusively for equestrian use, but may also incorporate additional facilities for spectators or stabling of horses.

An outdoor enclosure for riding horses is called a riding arena, (training) ring (US English), or (outdoor) school (British English) or, sometimes, a manège (British English). (Note: US dictionaries only record three other meanings for this term.) In other languages, the French word manège, or a derivative, means "riding hall" since, in French, the word refers to an indoor hall, while an outdoor arena is called a carrière.

== Building design ==
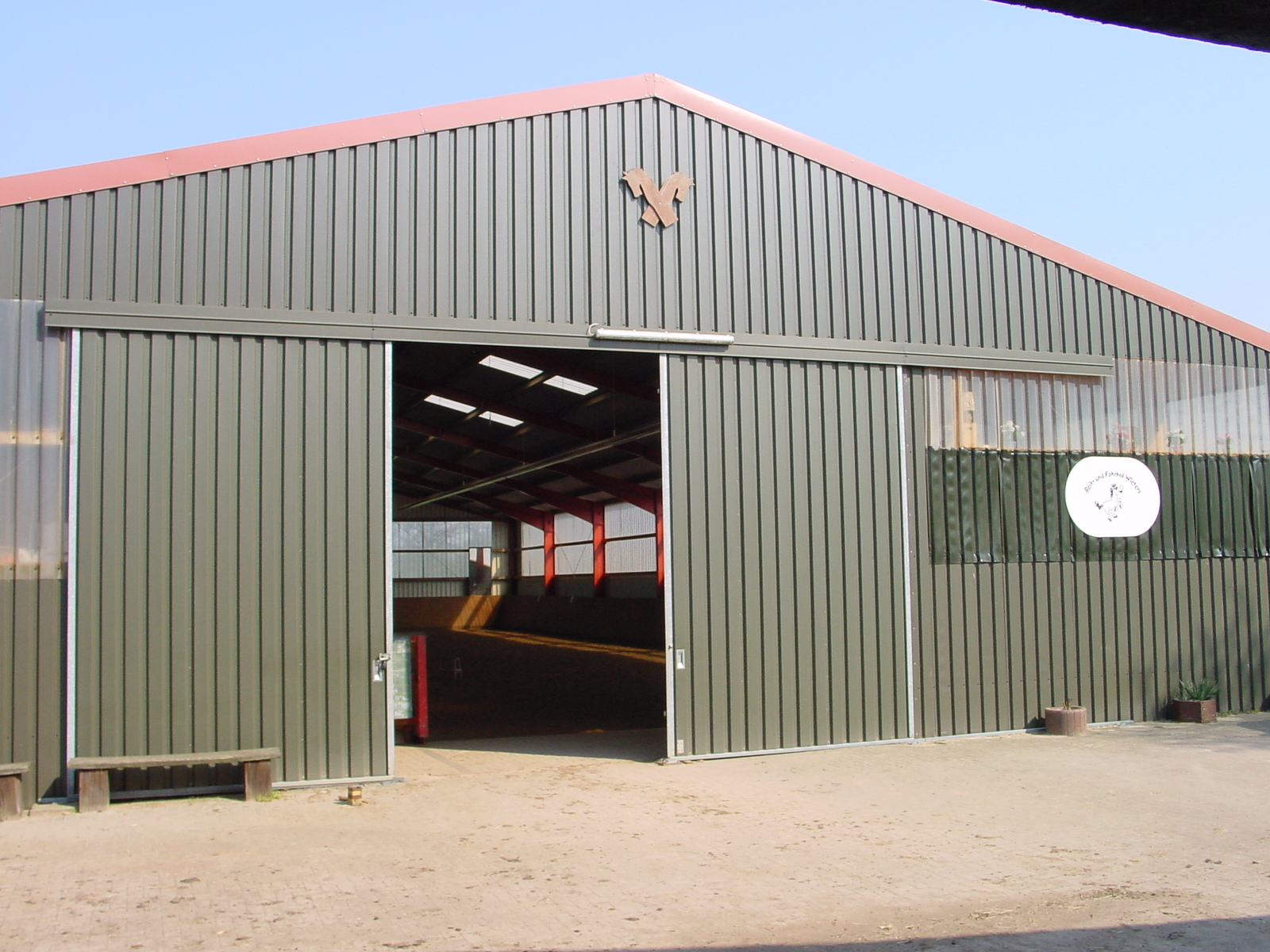
Exterior view of a riding hall of modern lightweight construction

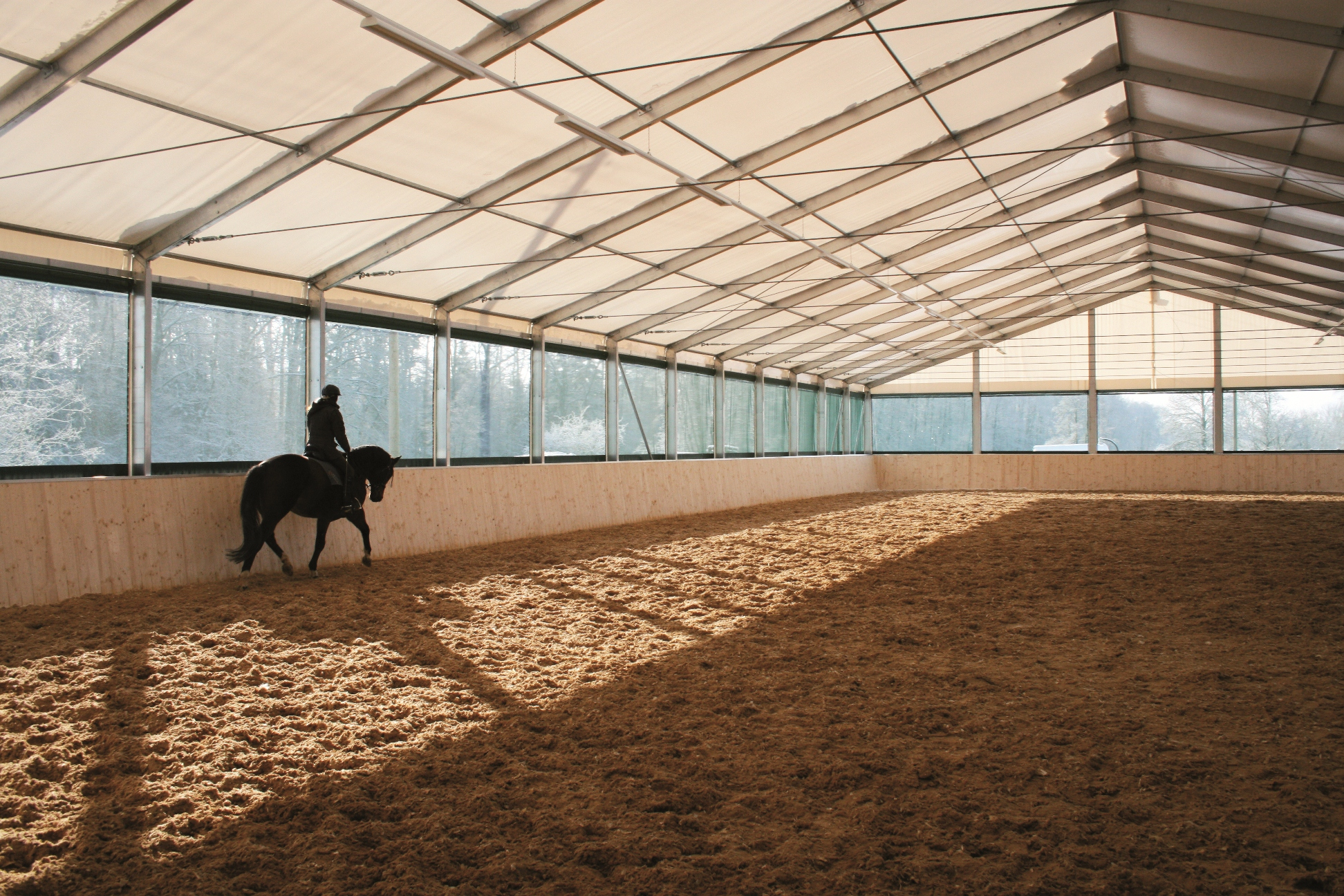
A textile riding hall

Riding halls enable horses and riders to train or compete in dry conditions regardless of the weather. There are various designs. The most popular are either steel-girder or timber-framed buildings, with wood, brick or sheet-metal panels. Roofs can be made of various materials including sandwich panels, corrugated steel, or in smaller buildings, wood. In some cases, stables are built either nearby or attached to a riding hall, sometimes under the same roof. In addition, tension fabric buildings are also used as arenas. These textile buildings usually consist of an aluminium frame and a high-strength PVC-covered sheet roof as well as wind protection or windbreak(er) netting in the walls.

== Construction ==
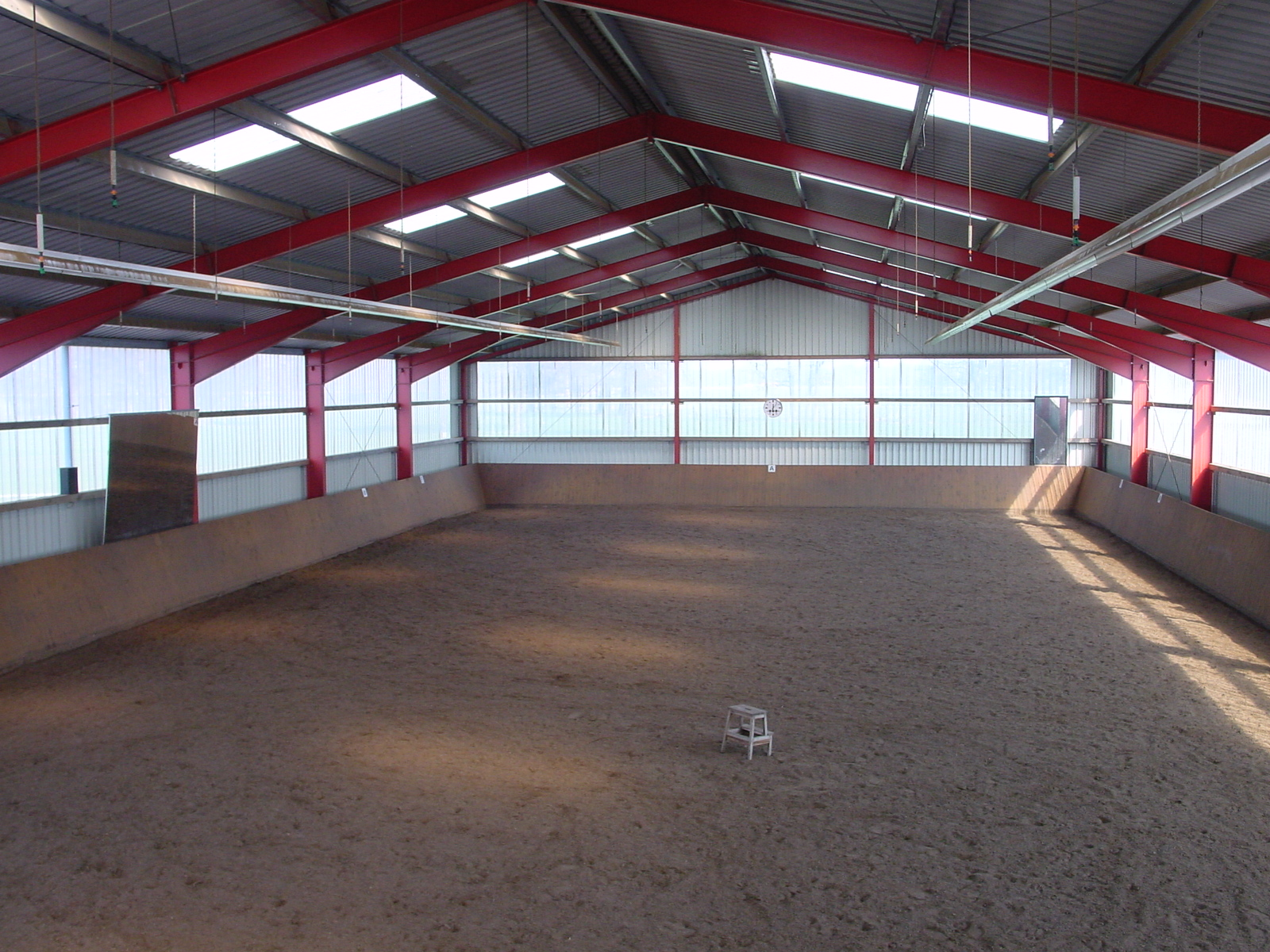
Interior view of a riding hall with watering facilities

Riding halls are built with the following criteria in mind:

- The arena must be as large as possible for the purposes intended. Commercial arenas may be smaller than private facilities. Smaller halls may provide an advantage for certain disciplines.
- There should be no support columns in the arena; obstacles such as jumps are generally moveable, dressage pillars may be an exception
- The hall must have high, wide doors that are easy to open.
- The hall should be illuminated as much as possible by daylight, preferably from above via skylights or similar design elements.

Government approval, building permits, or other official permissions are often required to build riding halls. Buildings intended for commercial or public uses may also have stands or other seating included with the structure. Facilities such as toilets or concessions may be included in a commercial facility.

== Functional design ==
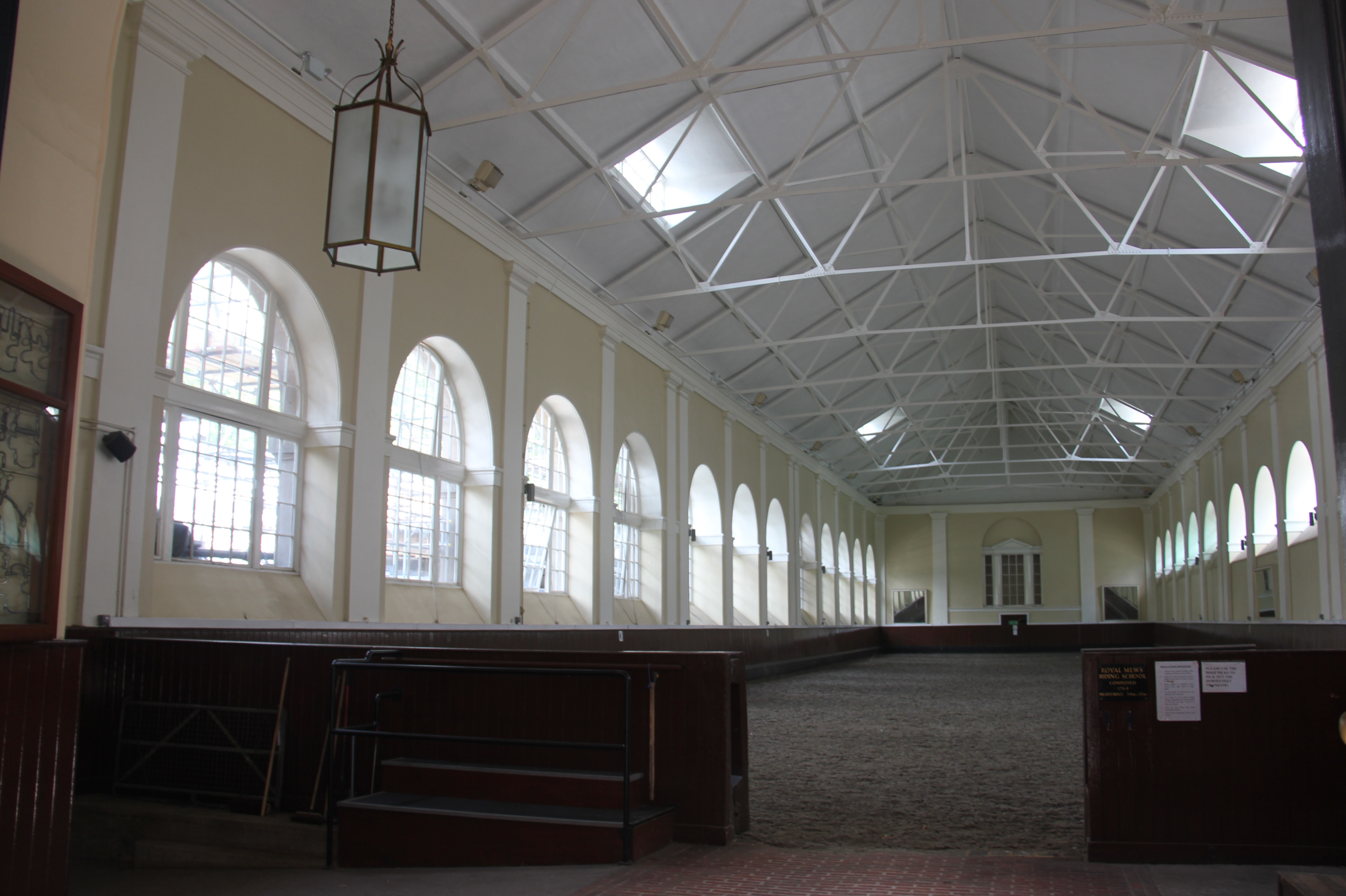
The Riding School at Buckingham Palace Royal Mews in London dates from 1764. It measures 54 m × 15 m (177 ft × 49 ft).

Riding halls are usually not heated because this is healthier for the horses. There is no set standard, but many arenas have dressage standard dimensions of 20 by 60 metres (66 ft × 197 ft) or the small arena standard of 20 by 40 metres (66 ft × 131 ft). Commercial arenas may be larger. In the United States, a clear span of at least 60 to 70 feet (18 to 21 m) is a common minimum width, with 100 feet (30 m) and up seen in structures open to the public for competitive events. While length varies significantly, lengths from 90 to 200 feet (27 to 61 m) are common for private arenas.

Of great importance is the footing quality. Floors often consist of a top layer of 100mm of silica sand over a complex aggregate substrate designed to ensure proper drainage. A good riding surface needs to have the right level of moisture content to reduce the amount of dust, aid maintenance and ensure good rideability. This may be achieved by an automatic floor watering facility – whereby the floor is watered from sprinklers above it, by regular watering with hoses and ground-based sprinklers or by underground irrigation using e.g. ebb and flow riding surface systems.

Lighting is also particularly important. The sensitivity of horses to dark and light makes it essential to have consistent lighting. Skylights are common. Artificial light needs to be diffused and non-dazzling and brightness needs to be adjustable depending on the riding discipline being performed.

== Special purpose halls ==
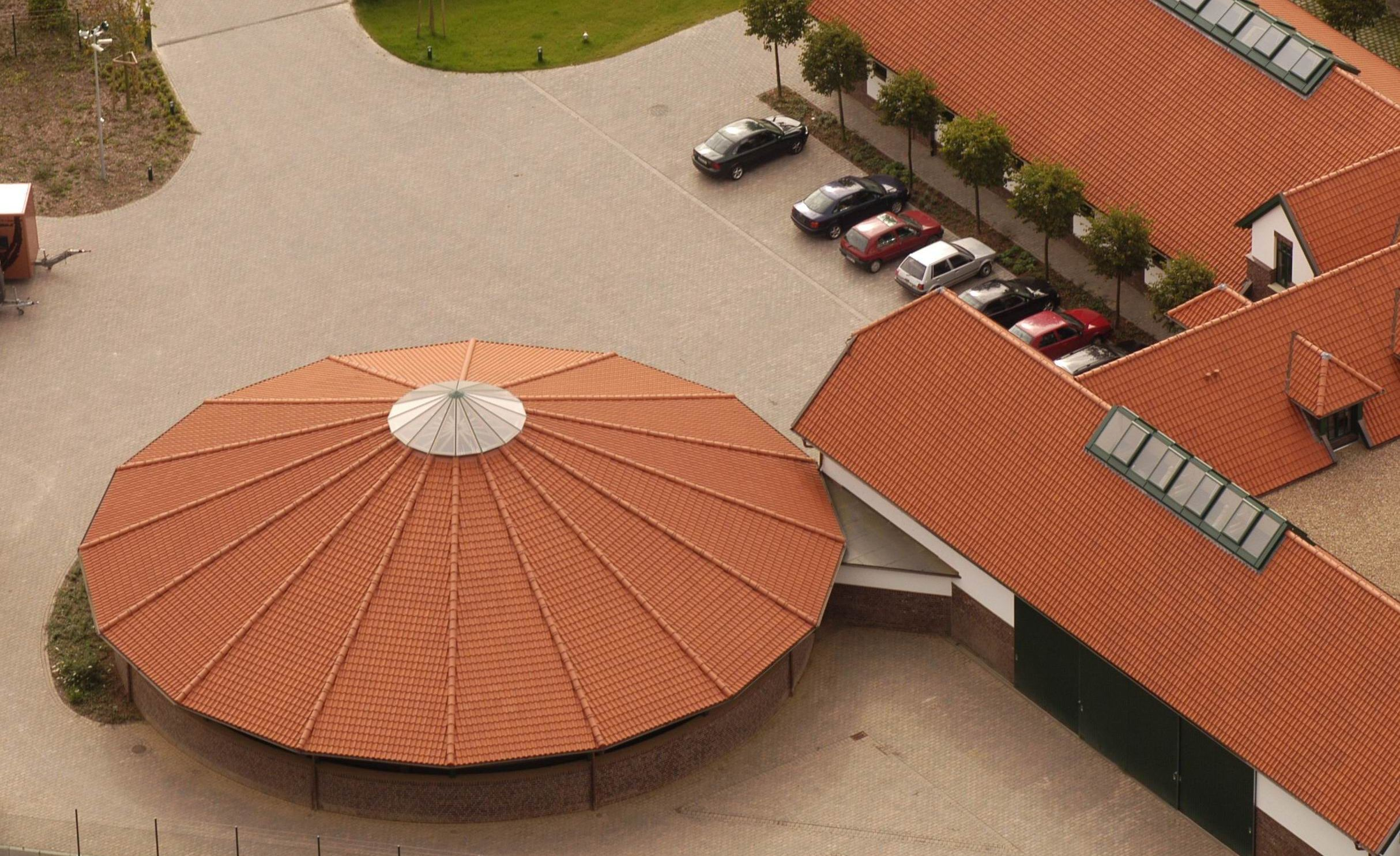
Lungeing hall in Syke, Germany

A lungeing hall is a smaller hall for lungeing horses. Most lungeing halls are circular and have a diameter of 16–24 metres. Rectangular designs may be cheaper to build and give horses a better spatial orientation. Lungeing halls also generally needs building permission.

== Famous riding halls ==
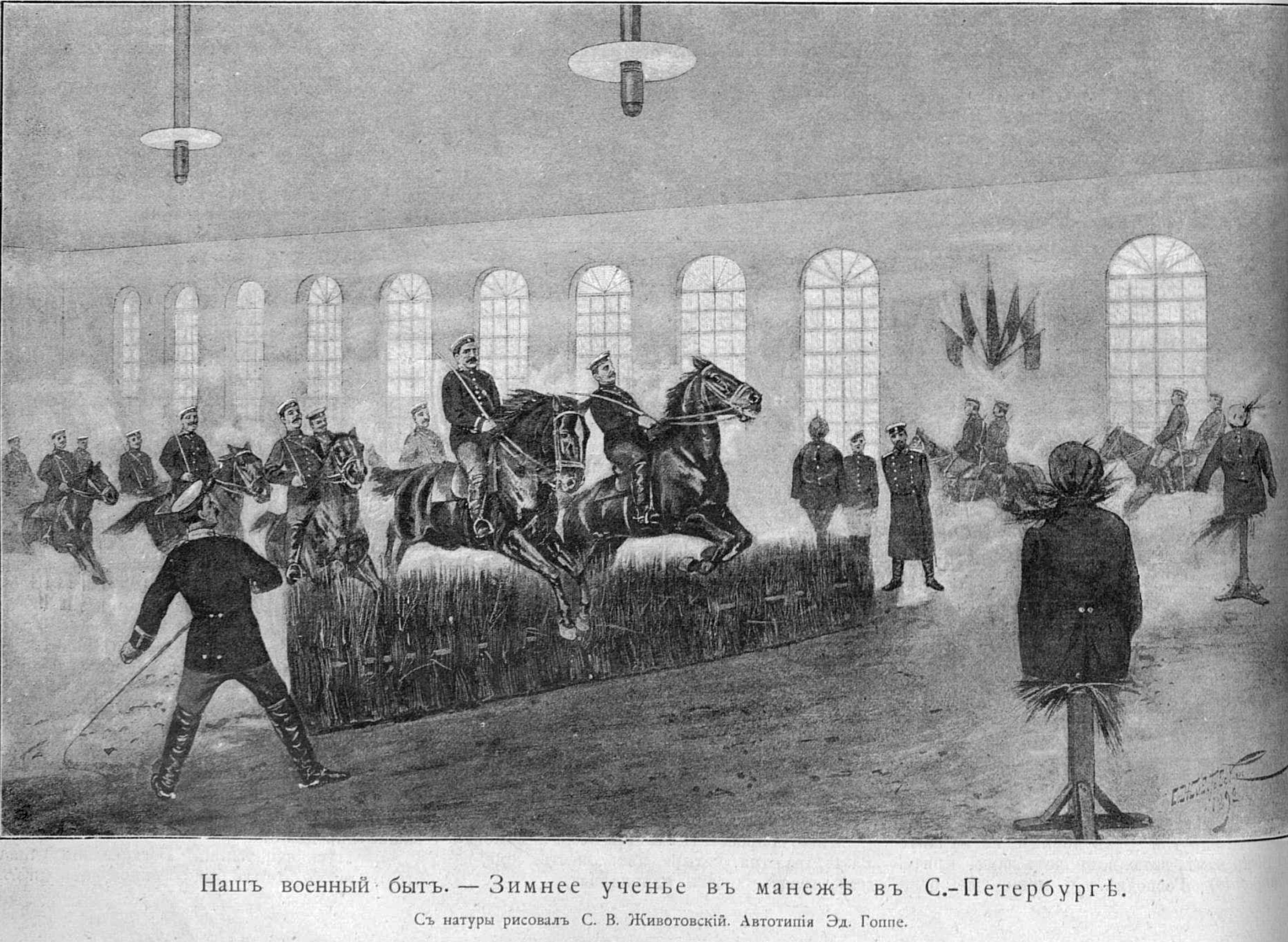
Winter exercises at the Saint Petersburg Manege, 1890s

- Spanish Riding School, Vienna
- Salle du Manège, Paris
- Moscow Manege and Saint Petersburg Manege in Russia
- Belém Riding Hall, Lisbon

== See also ==
- Arena
- Hall
- Round pen
