= Muzzle (mouth guard) =

Device that is placed over the snout of an animal

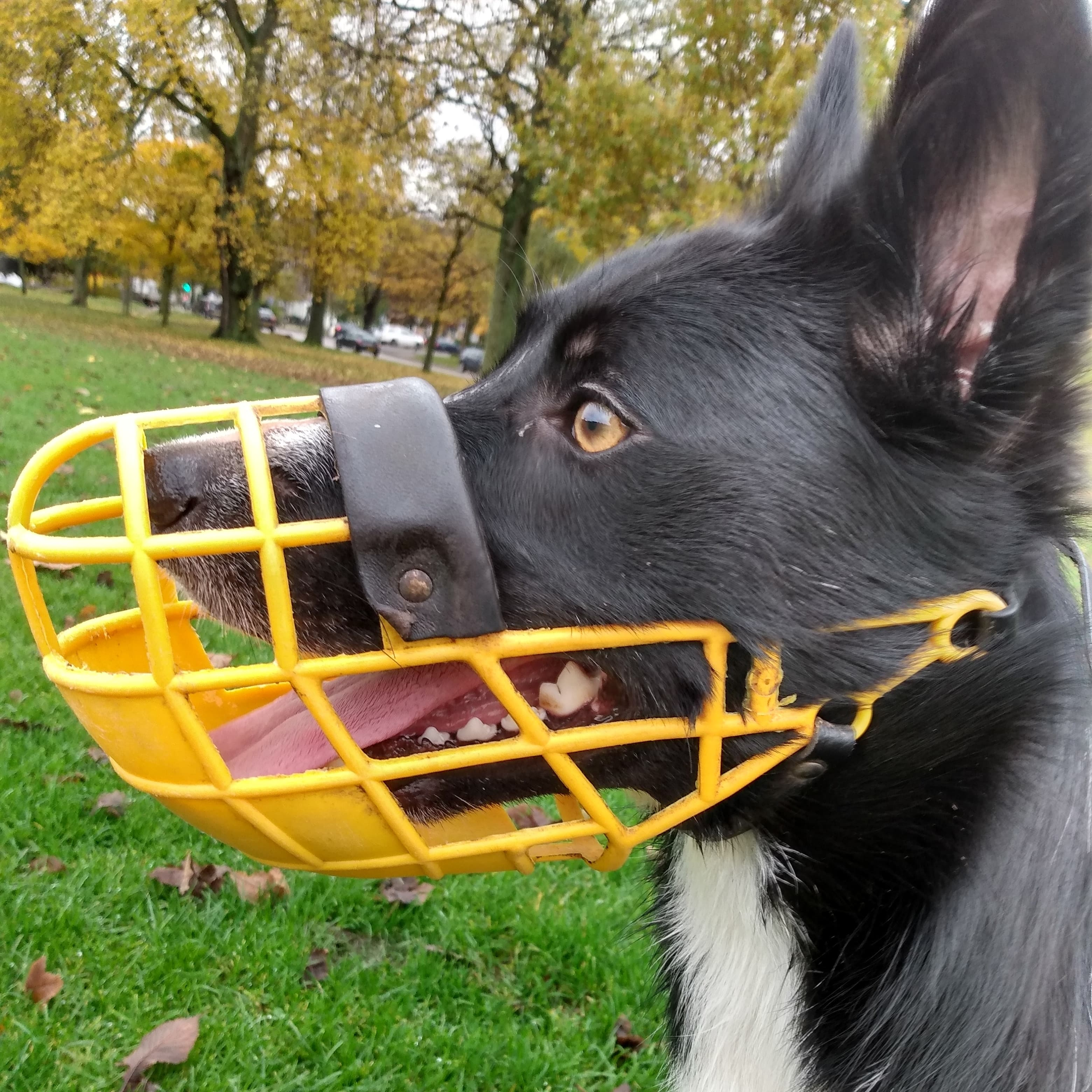
A Border Collie wearing a yellow greyhound muzzle.

A muzzle is a device that is placed over the snout of an animal to keep them from biting or otherwise opening their mouth.

Muzzles can be primarily solid, with air holes to allow the animal to breathe, or formed from a set of straps that provides better air circulation and allow the animal to drink, and in some cases, eat. Leather, wire, plastic, and nylon are common materials for muzzles. The shape and construction of the muzzle might differ depending on whether the intent is to prevent an animal from biting or from eating, for example.

== Dog muzzles ==
Muzzles are sometimes used on trained and untrained dogs, large or small, to prevent unwanted biting, scavenging, or wound licking. They can also be used on dogs who display aggression, whether motivated by excitement, fear, or prey drive. Muzzles are also used on dogs when there is a risk of them taking baits that have been laid for vermin.

Muzzles can also be used on racing dogs and working dogs (military, police, security, etc.).

They are usually made with a strong buckle or other fastening device to ensure that they do not come off accidentally. The most suitable materials for dog muzzles are leather, nylon, plastic and others. The most comfortable muzzles for dogs are those with wire cage construction. Muzzles of this kind give enough freedom for a dog to eat, drink and freely pant. The latter two are of vital importance, especially in hot weather.

Dog muzzles can be found in most pet supply stores.

== Equine muzzles ==
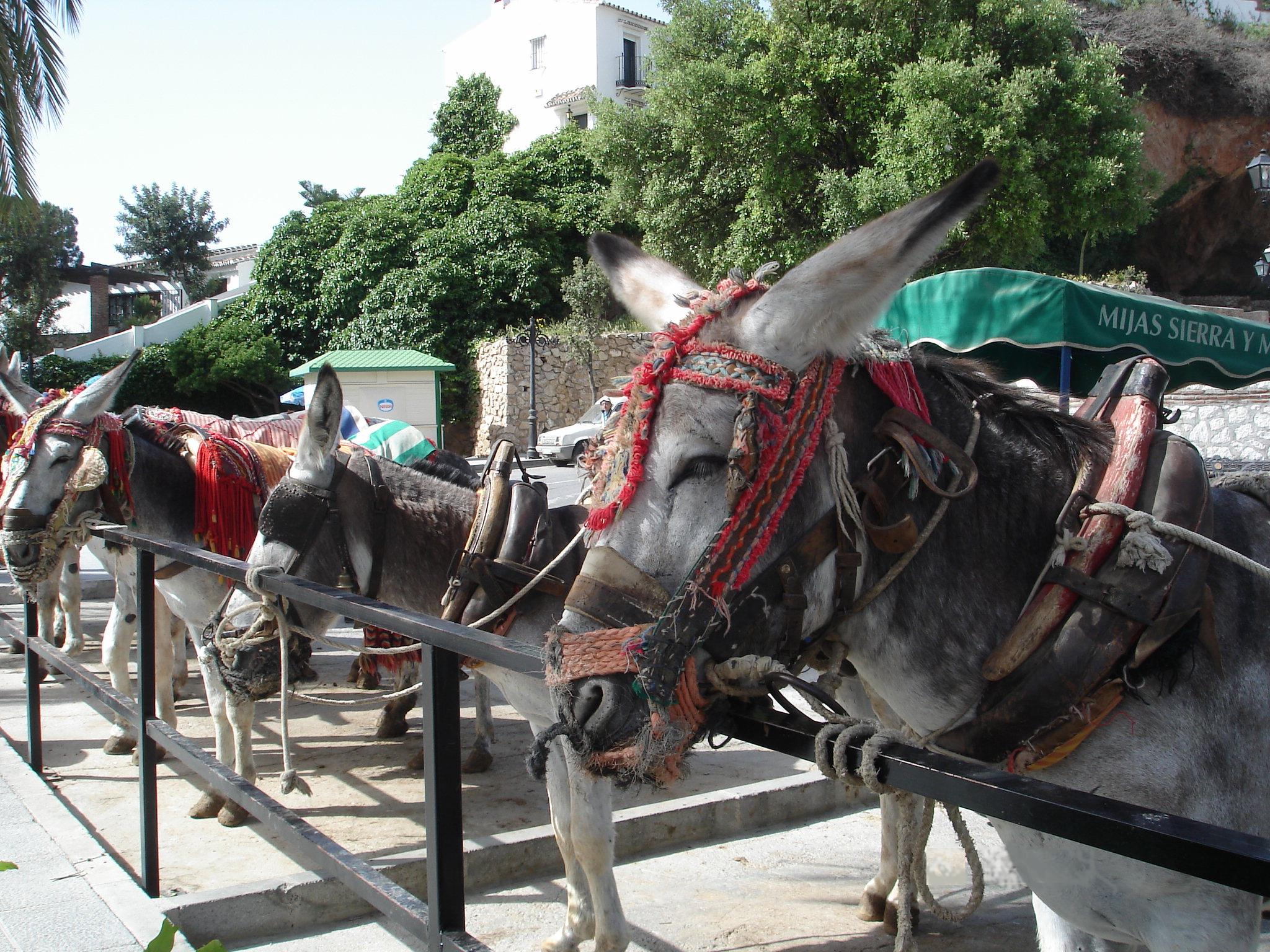
Donkeys wearing muzzles

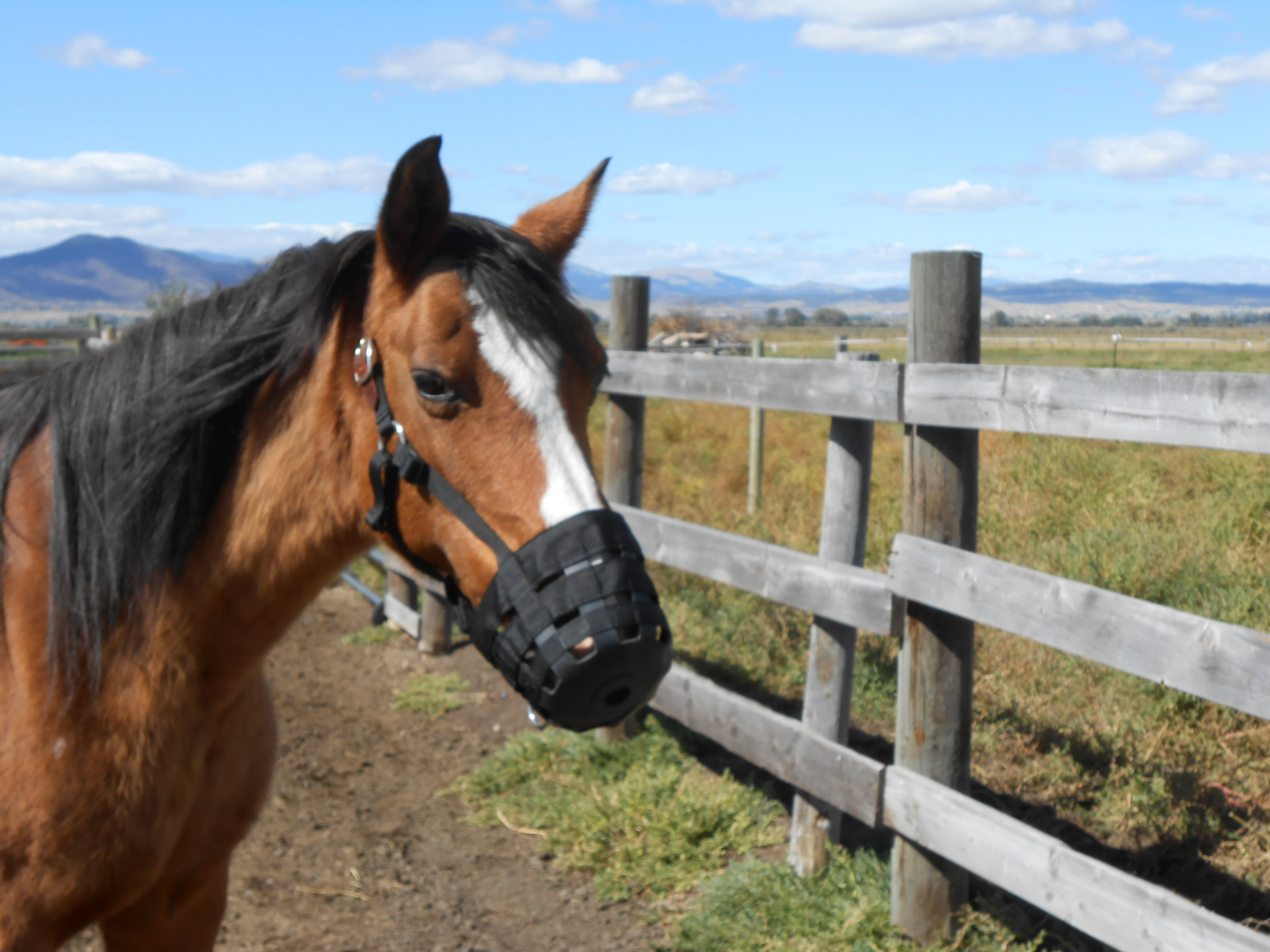
A grazing muzzle on a horse

Certain muzzles are used on horses and related animals, usually to prevent biting or cribbing.

Other types, known as "grazing muzzles", have a small opening in the center that allows limited intake of grass, and are used on those animals prone to obesity, laminitis or choke, to prevent them from eating too much or too fast.

Grazing muzzles can restrict a horses intake of grass or other forage, while still allowing them to be turned out in a herd with other horses.

Horse muzzles may be purchased in tack shops or from equestrian supply companies, and are available as a halter attachment, or as a separate piece of equipment.

== Cow muzzles ==
A device under development in England to reduce greenhouse gas emissions aims to capture methane by placing a muzzle on the cow's nose, which converts the methane they burp into carbon dioxide and water.

== See also ==
- Elizabethan collar
- Scold's bridle
- Spit hood
