= James J. and Anna J. (Linean) Smith House No. 1 =

Historic house in Iowa, United States

- James J. and Anna J. (Linean) Smith House #1
- U.S. National Register of Historic Places
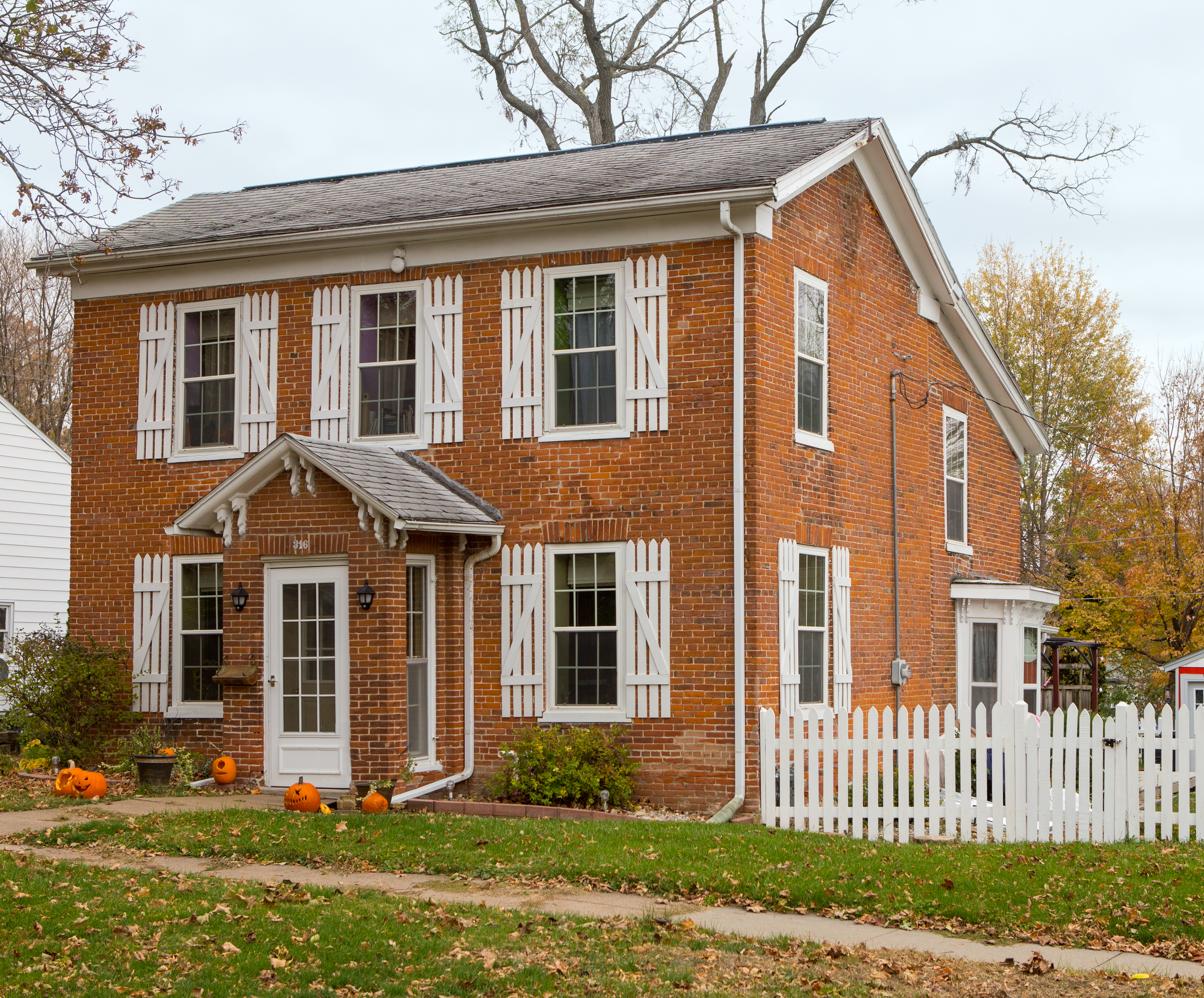

- Location within Iowa Location within the United States
- Location: 316 3rd Ave. SW; Mount Vernon, Iowa
- Coordinates: 41°55′16″N 91°25′15″W
- Area: less than one acre
- Built: 1859
- MPS: Mount Vernon MPS
- NRHP reference No.: 100005496
- Added to NRHP: August 27, 2020

The James J. and Anna J. (Linean) Smith House No. 1, also known as the Lanning House, Ford House, and Sinclair House, is a historic building located in Mount Vernon, Iowa, United States. It is significant for its association with the settlement of the city that was influenced by the establishment of the Military Road, its use of locally made brick and locally quarried limestone, and its vernacular architectural techniques. This was the first of two brick houses built by the Smiths. There were two additions built onto the rear of the house. It is thought that the Smiths built the first addition in the early 1860s and the Fords, a later owner, added the second in the 1870s. Both additions utilized the same reddish-orange brick of the original construction. J.J. Smith had bought the property from Harrison and Hannah Hall and had the house built in 1859. It is possible that the livery stable that he operated, the first in Mount Vernon, was also on the property. Having built their second house, the Smith's sold this house in 1864 to Jacob and Elizabeth Lanning. It was listed on the National Register of Historic Places in 2020.
