= Equestrian facility =

Kind of facility

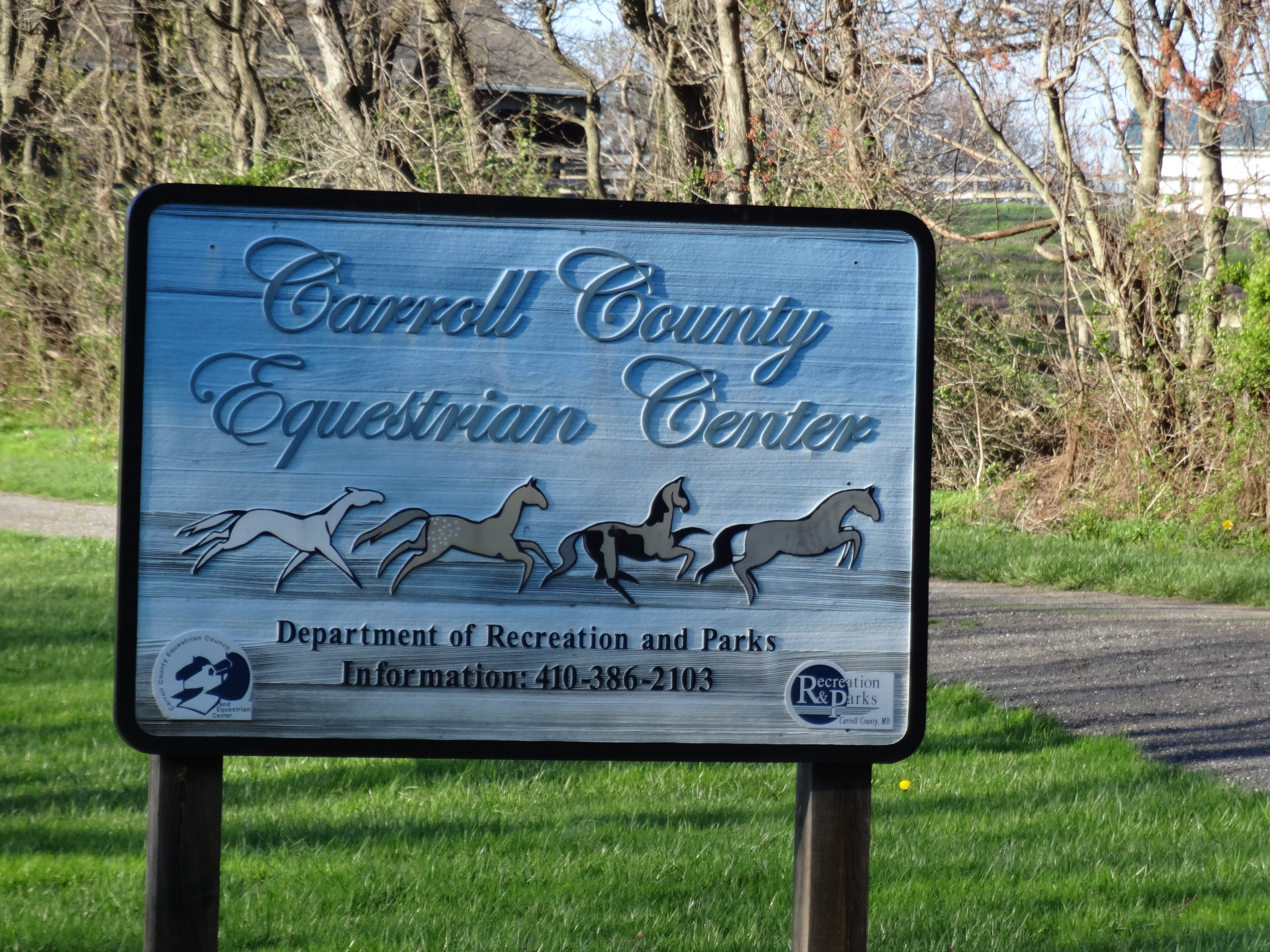
Carroll County Equestrian Center in Maryland is an example of a publicly operated equestrian facility.

An equestrian facility is created and maintained for the purpose of accommodating, training or competing equids, especially horses. Based on their use, they may be known as a barn, stables, or riding hall and may include commercial operations described by terms such as a boarding stable, livery yard, or livery stable. Larger facilities may be called equestrian centers and co-located with complementary services such as a riding school, farriers, vets, tack shops, or equipment repair.

== Horse accommodation ==
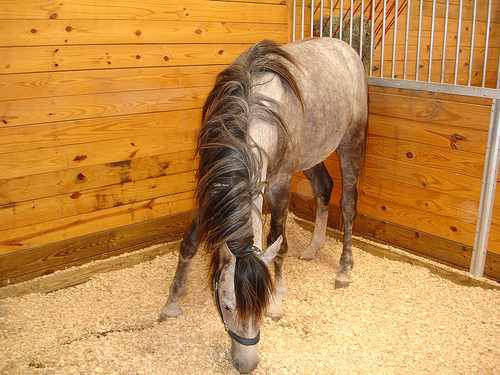
A horse in a box, which allows freedom of movement

Horses are often kept inside buildings known as barns or stables, which provide shelter for the animals. These buildings are normally subdivided to provide a separate stall or box for each horse, which prevents horses injuring each other, separates horses of different genders, allows for individual care regimens such as restricted or special feeding, and makes handling easier.

The design of stables can vary widely, based on climate, building materials, historical period, and cultural styles of architecture. A wide range of building materials can be used, including masonry (bricks or stone), wood, and steel. Stables can range widely in size, from a small building to house only one or two animals, to facilities used at agricultural shows or at race tracks, which can house hundreds of animals.

Terminology relating to horse accommodation differs between American and British English, with additional regional variations of terms. The term "stables" to describe the overall building is used in most major variants of English, but in American English (AmE) the singular form "stable" is also used to describe a building. In British English (BrE), the singular term "stable" refers only to a box for a single horse, while in the USA the term "box stall" or "stall" describes such an individual enclosure.

=== Types of box ===
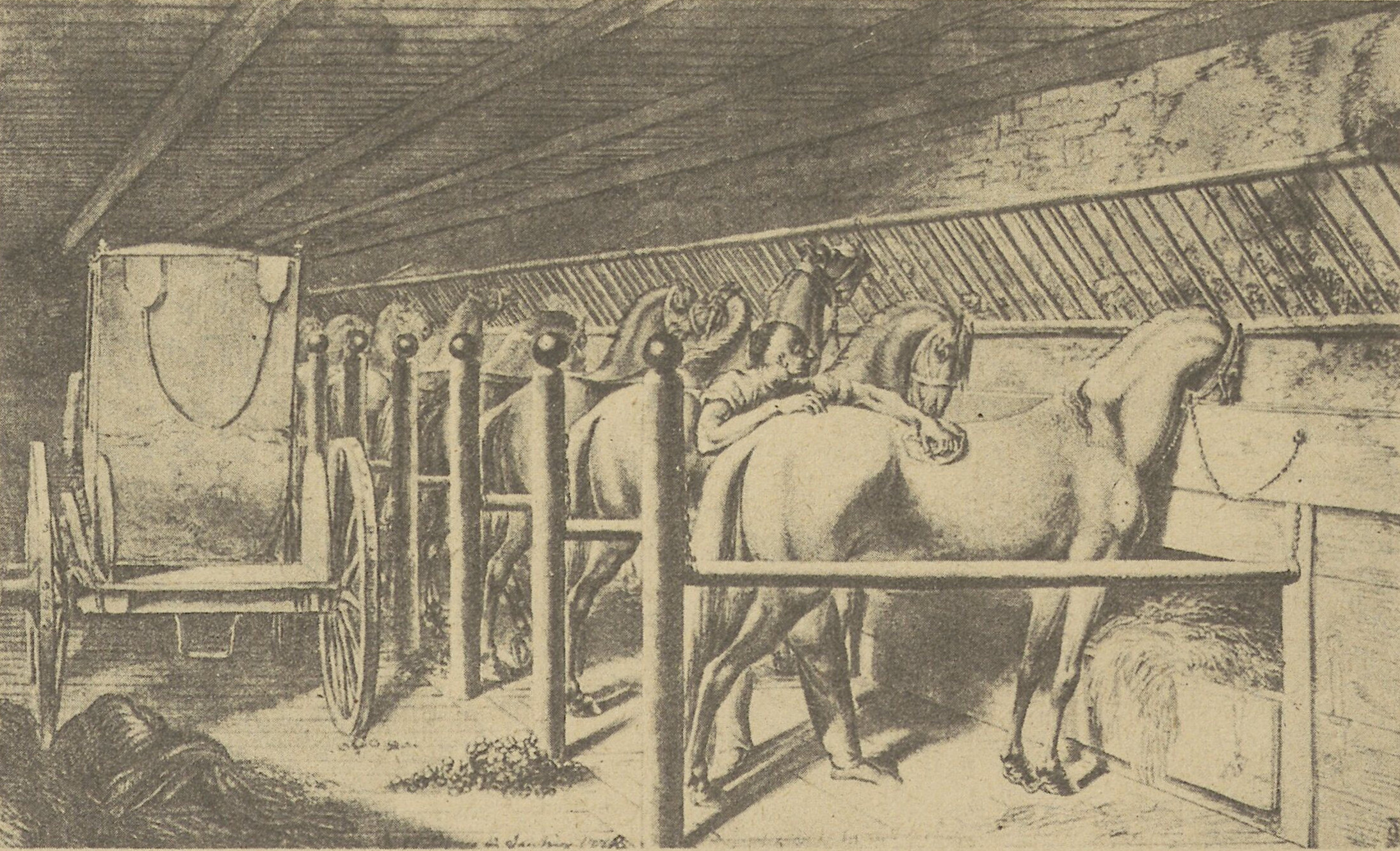
A set of restricted movement stalls in an 18th-century stable

In most stables, each horse is kept in a box or stall of its own. These are of two principal types:

- Boxes allowing freedom of movement – Horses are able to turn around, choose which way to face and lie down if they wish. These can also be known as a loose box (BrE), a stable (BrE), a stall (AmE) or box stall (AmE).
- Stalls restricting movement – These are known as a stall (BrE) or a tie stall (AmE). The horse is restricted in movement, can normally face only in one direction, and may or may not be able to lie down, depending on width and if or how tightly the animal is tied. They are usually restrained through being tied at one end of the stall by a rope to a halter or headcollar. Common dimensions are 4 to 5 feet (1.2 to 1.5 m) wide by 8 to 10 feet (2.4 to 3.0 m) long.

The choice of type of box is likely to relate to the available space, local custom, welfare concerns, and workload of the horses. In some countries, local organisations give recommendations as to the minimum size of accommodation for a horse. For instance, in Britain, the British Horse Society recommends that horses be kept only in boxes which allow freedom of movement, and that these should measure a minimum of 10 feet (3.0 m) square for ponies, and 12 feet (3.7 m) square for horses. Common practice in the United States follows similar sizes. Stallions are sometimes kept in larger boxes, up to 14 feet (4.3 m) square, and mares about to foal or with foal at side are sometimes kept in a double-sized stall.

=== Method of operation ===
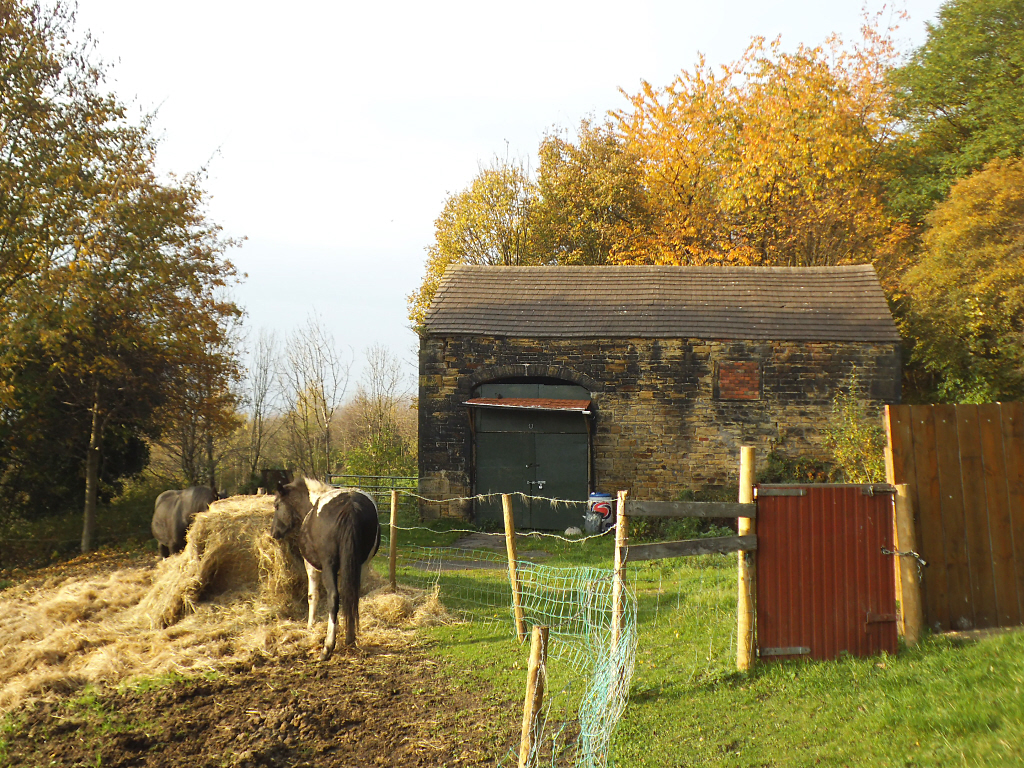
Equestrian facility in the United Kingdom.

Stables can be maintained privately for an owner's own horses or operated as a public business where a fee is charged for keeping other people's horses. In some places, stables are run as riding schools, where horses are kept for the purpose of providing lessons for people learning to ride or even as a livery stable (US) or hireling yard (UK), where horses are loaned out for activities in exchange for money.

When operated as a business where owners bring their horses to be boarded, they are known as "livery yards" (BrE) or "boarding stables" (AmE and Australian English). There are a number of arrangements that horse owners can make with operators of these stables. The least expensive is when the horse owner does all of the work related to the care of the horse themselves, called "do-it-yourself" (DIY) or "self-board". In the middle range, the term "full board" is used in the US to refer to several options, depending on the part of the country, from a facility that simply feeds the animals and possibly provides turnout, to one that handles all care of the horse, sometimes including exercise under saddle but not training per se. At the top end, the facility operator manages the entire care of the horse, including riding and training. In the UK, this is called "full livery". In the US, such settings may be called a "training stable". There are intermediate stages of care with parts of the care of the horse undertaken by each party, using terms such as "part livery" or "part board", with the terms not universal, even within individual countries, and usually agreed between owner and operator.

Some stables also offer a service for horses to live on pasture only, without a space inside the stable buildings, known as "grass livery" (BrE), "agistment" (BrE), or "pasture board" (AmE).

Where the stables also house a riding school or hireling operation, some operators may also offer a "working livery" (UK) or "partial lease" (US), where the horse owner pays a discounted rate (or no money at all) for their own horse's care in return for the riding school being able to offer the horse to paying customers other than the owner.

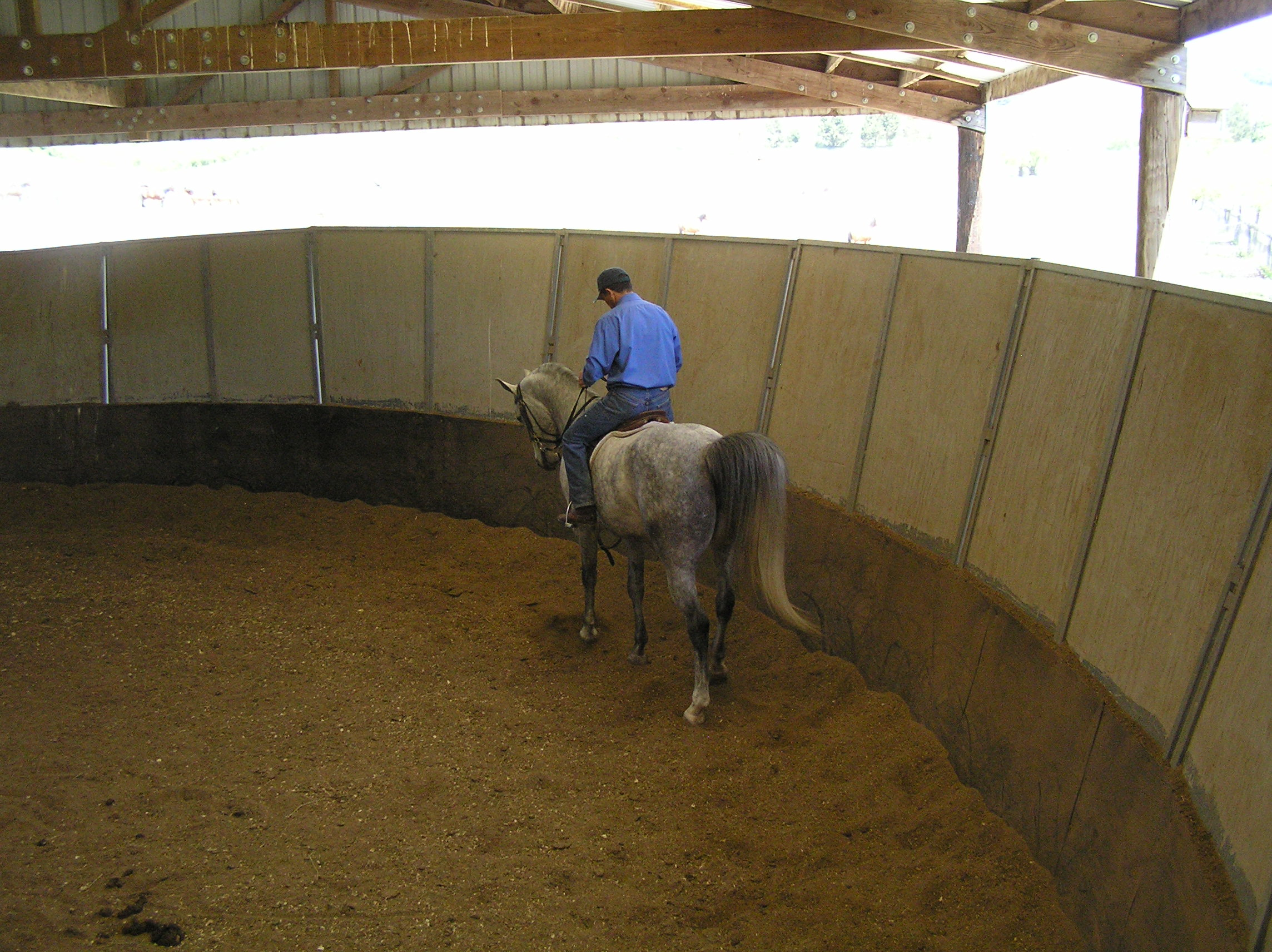
A solid-walled round pen, used for schooling

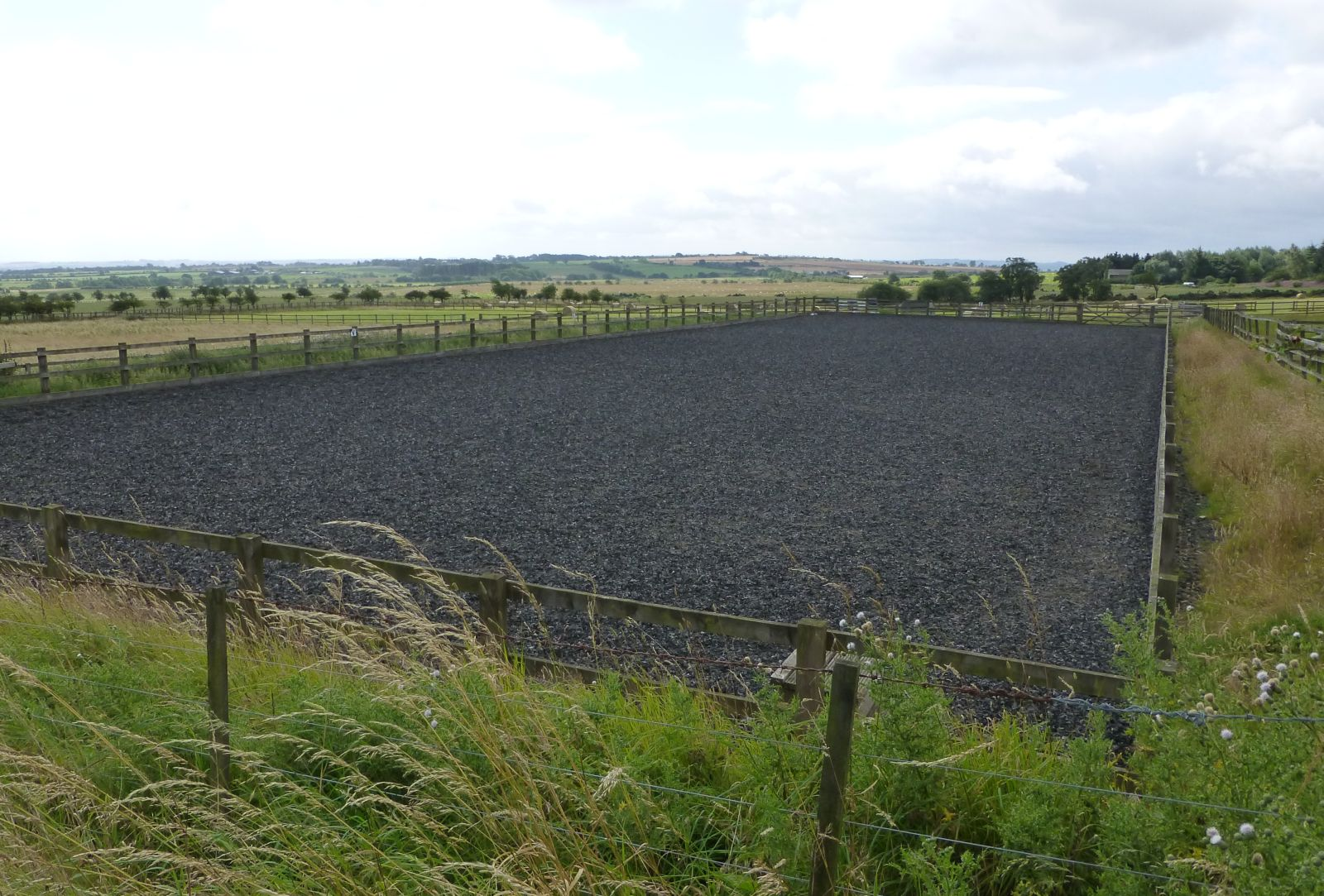
Outdoor riding or schooling arena with rubberized footing.

== Schools, arenas and pens ==
Horses are often exercised under human control, ridden or competed within designated fenced or enclosed places, usually called schools, pens or arenas. These can be of almost any size, provided they are sufficiently large for a horse to move freely, and can be located indoors or outdoors.

The smallest are the round pen popular with natural horsemanship practitioners, which generally start at 40 to 60 feet (12 to 18 m) in diameter. Most arenas designed to allow more than one horse and rider pair to exercise safely at the same time are rectangular in shape and at the barest minimum are 50 to 60 feet (15 to 18 m) wide and at least 90 to 120 feet (27 to 37 m) long. The largest are commercial facilities designed for competitive events open to the general public with a performance space well over 150 by 300 feet (46 by 91 m)

A riding academy or riding center is a school for instruction in equestrianism, or for hiring of horses for pleasure riding. Most feature a large indoor riding arena. At the time of the Napoleonic Wars large buildings were constructed for them, like Moscow Manege, Mikhailovsky and Konnogvardeisky maneges in St Petersburg.

== Grazing and open space ==
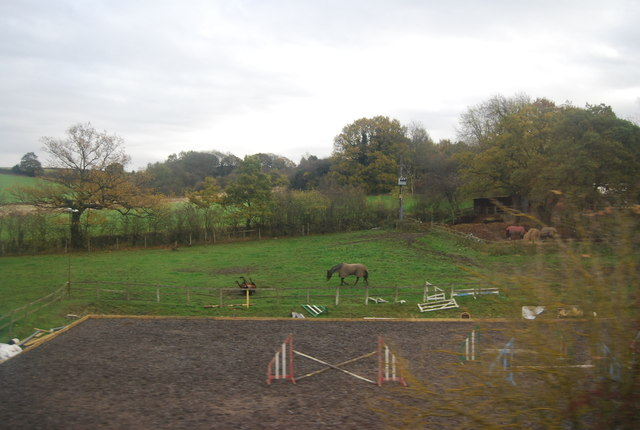
Example of a grazing paddock and schooling area at an equestrian facility.

Many horses are turned out in to fields to graze, exercise, or exhibit other natural behaviours, either on their own or more usually as part of a herd, where they may also engage in play activity and social bonding.

The area where the horses are placed can be of any size, from a small pen with room to run, to wide areas covering thousands of square miles. In the United Kingdom this may range from open moorland without internal subdivision, down to small, fenced areas of grass, called pastures or paddocks in British English. A large turnout of several acres is a paddock in Australia, a pasture is significantly larger. In the United States, similar large spaces ranging from a few to many acres are called pastures or, for larger areas of public land or private unfenced ranch land approaching 100 acres or more, rangeland.

Where the purpose of turning the horses out is to encourage activity and not for forage, for instance where a horse is stabled for a large portion of the day, or where additional forage is not desired, they may be turned out in to areas with no grass, to encourage activity and prevent grazing. In the USA, such spaces are called a paddock or, in the western United States, a corral, in the British Isles, a paddock, and in Australia, a pen. Sometimes the colloquialism "starvation" is prefixed to these grassless areas, though the intent is not to starve the horse, but simply to regulate diet. This also could include a space such as a riding arena, doing double-duty as a turnout area. Equine nutritionists and management specialists also recommend a grassless area, which they sometimes call a "sacrifice area," be fenced off from pastures intended for forage where horses can be placed when it is wet or muddy, to prevent the grass from being trampled, and during times of drought, to prevent or minimize overgrazing.
