= James J. and Anna J. (Linean) Smith House No. 2 =

Historic house in Iowa, United States

- James J. and Anna J. (Linean) Smith House #2
- U.S. National Register of Historic Places
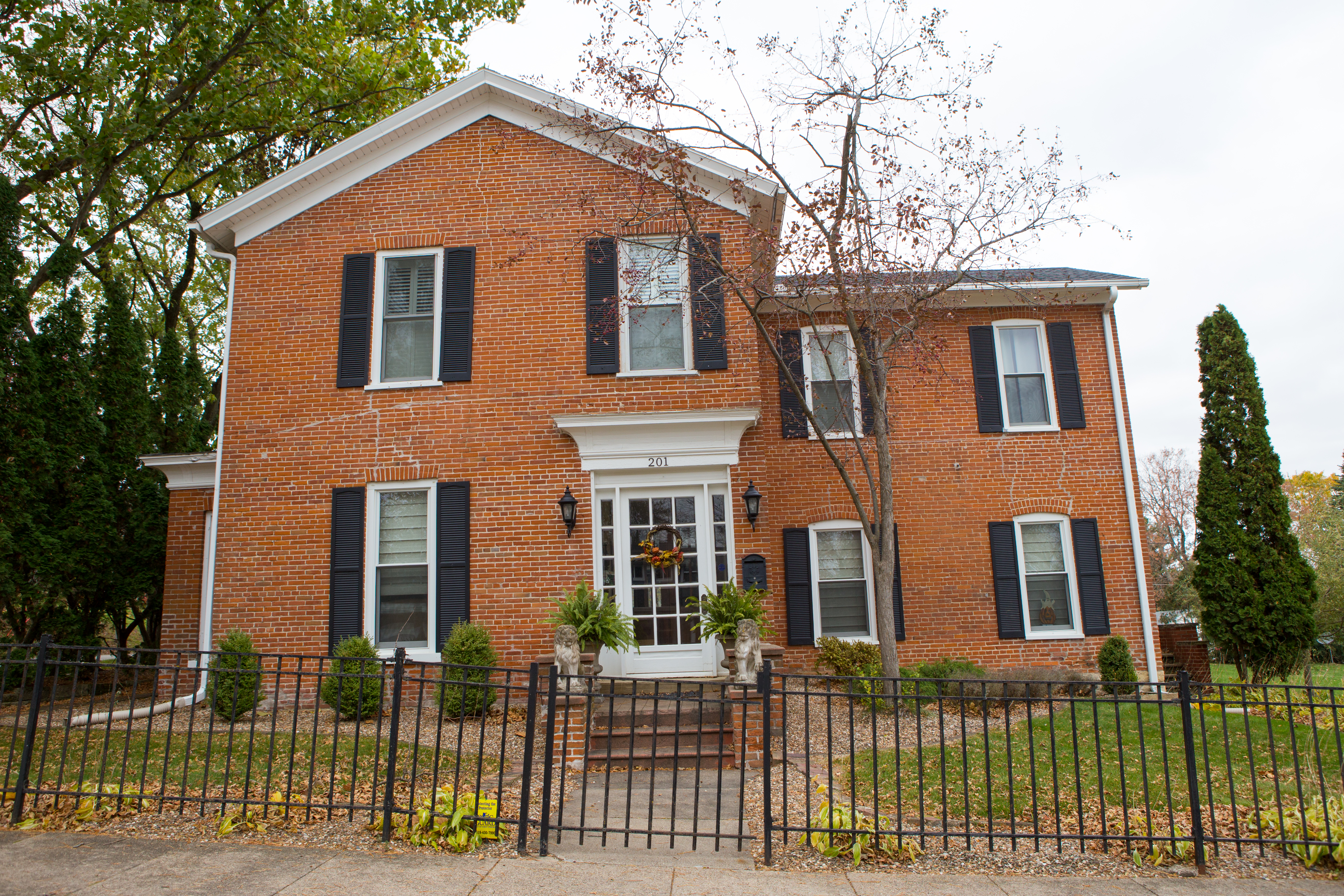

- Location within Iowa Location within the United States
- Location: 201 2nd Ave. NW; Mount Vernon, Iowa
- Coordinates: 41°55′26″N 91°25′03″W
- Area: less than one acre
- Built: 1864
- MPS: Mount Vernon MPS
- NRHP reference No.: 100005497
- Added to NRHP: August 27, 2020

The James J. and Anna J. (Linean) Smith House No. 2, also known as the D.L. and Margaret (Craig) Boyd House, is a historic building located in Mount Vernon, Iowa, United States. It is significant for its association with the settlement of the city that was influenced by the establishment of the Military Road, its use of locally made brick and locally quarried limestone, and its vernacular architectural techniques. This was the second of two brick houses built by the Smiths. The first house was built in 1859 on Third Avenue SW. They sold it after they had this house built in 1864. They added a large brick addition onto the north side of the house in 1875–1876. The two-story side-gabled structure features mid-19th century stylistic influences. Smith opened the first livery stable in Mount Vernon and became quite wealthy because of it and his land holdings. The house was listed on the National Register of Historic Places in 2020.
