= Round pen =

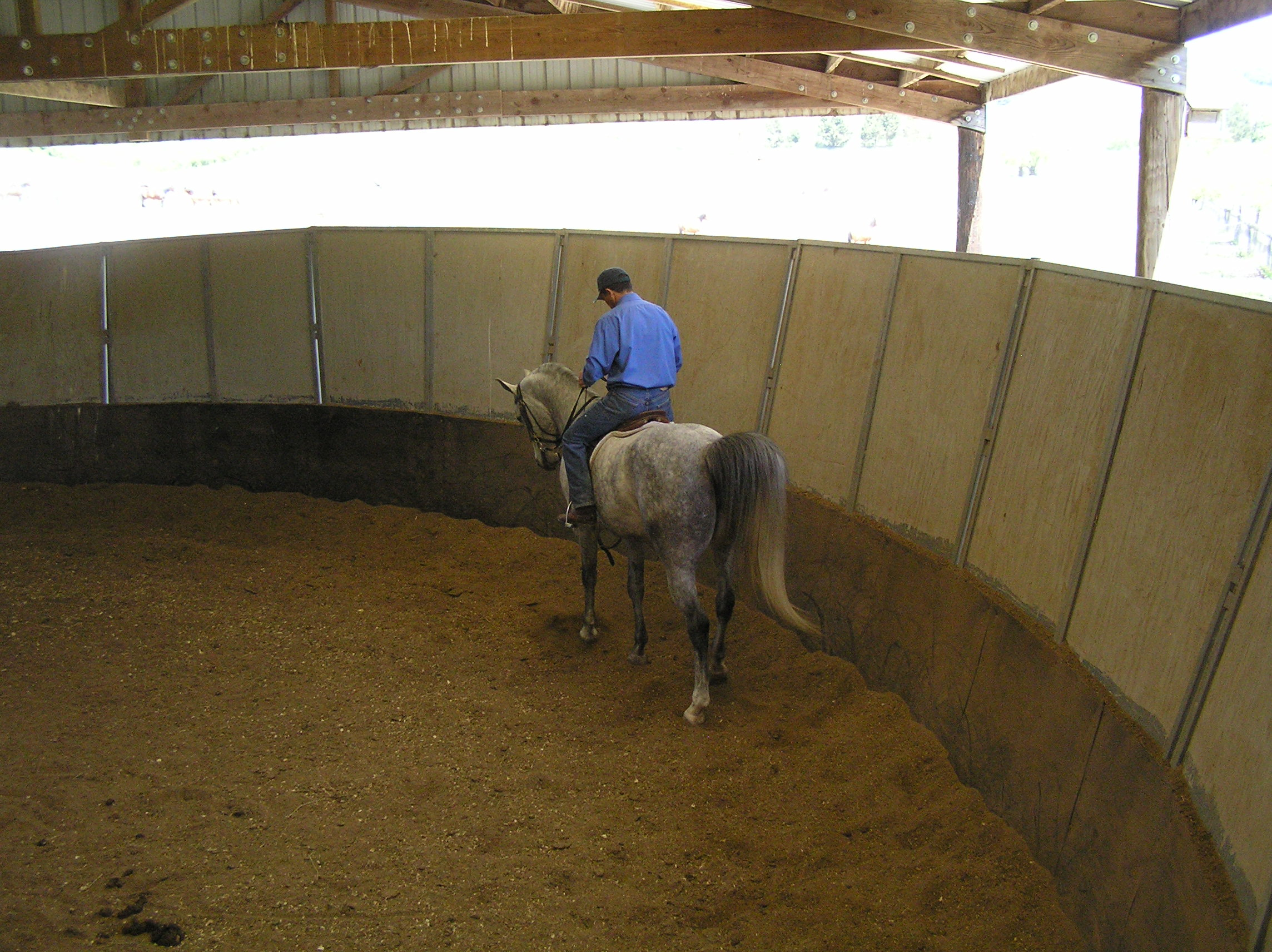
A solid-sided round pen, or "bullpen", enclosed with a roof

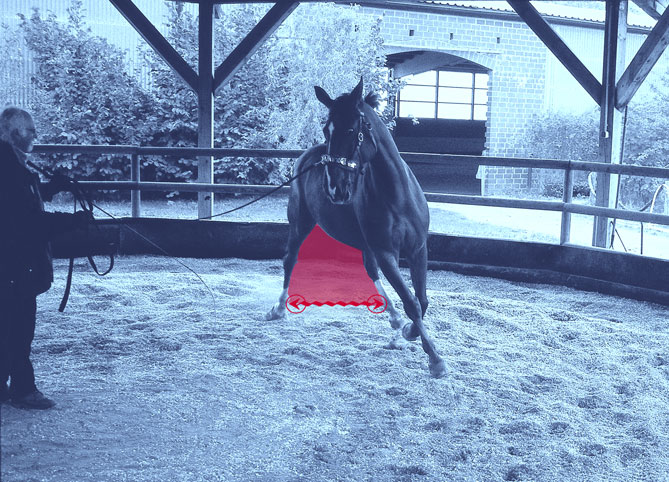
A round pen under a roof. Partially solid sides prevent dirt from being pushed out of the pen

The round pen, sometimes called a bullpen, is a round enclosure used for horse training. They range in diameter from a minimum of 30 feet (9.1 m) to a maximum of 100 feet (30 m), with most designs 50 to 60 feet (15 to 18 m) in diameter. Footing is usually sand or other soft dirt. The sides are 6 to 8 feet (1.8 to 2.4 m) high, traditionally made of wooden posts with rails or wooden boards, although modern round pens are often made out of portable pipe panels that allow the pen to be made bigger or smaller, or to be moved.

== Designs ==
Traditional designs intended for control of untamed feral horses are made of heavy lumber and up to 8 feet (2.4 m) high, to prevent the animal from jumping out or running through the fence. Traditional round pens have closely spaced rails that allow foot room for a human to climb out of the pen, but also give the fence great strength and also discourage the animal from seeking escape due to the near-solid appearance of closely spaced rails.

Most modern round pens, however, are intended for domesticated horses who do not fear humans. These designs commonly are built about 6 feet (1.8 m) high, which still discourages jumping out, but use fewer materials and are less expensive.

Another design made of pipe, 2 by 6 inches (51 by 152 mm) planks or round rails, resembles a traditional fence, with fewer rails than a traditional type, as the modern domestic horse usually respects fences and does not consider the normal gaps between fence rails to offer a means of escape. In this design, the bottom section of the fence may be solid to prevent the sand or loose dirt from being pushed out of the pen by the movement of the animal.

The last design sometimes called a "bullpen," has completely solid walls, usually plywood placed over traditional rails or planks, to completely block all outside visual distractions and to allow the horse to concentrate on the handler. Sometimes the walls of a bullpen slant outward slightly. The solid-walled design may also reduce wind, and thus allow work in more inclement weather than a more open design. The drawback to a bullpen design is that the solid, smooth walls hinder a human's escape from the pen by climbing over the fence if needed.

== Location ==
Most round pens are located outdoors, but due to their relatively small size can easily be enclosed by a roof or a tension fabric building. Round pens made of portable panels are sometimes set up within a larger riding arena allowing one horse to be worked in the round pen while others may still ride along the rail of the larger area.

== History ==
The round pen has historic roots dating to the tradition of Spanish horsemanship and probably even earlier antecedents. In North America, it was used for horse-breaking in Mexico and came north with the vaqueros to be adopted by cowboys in the western United States. Today the round pen is used in Europe for some forms of classical dressage training and in the Americas as a common tool of western riding training methodology that is particularly popular with the natural horsemanship movement.

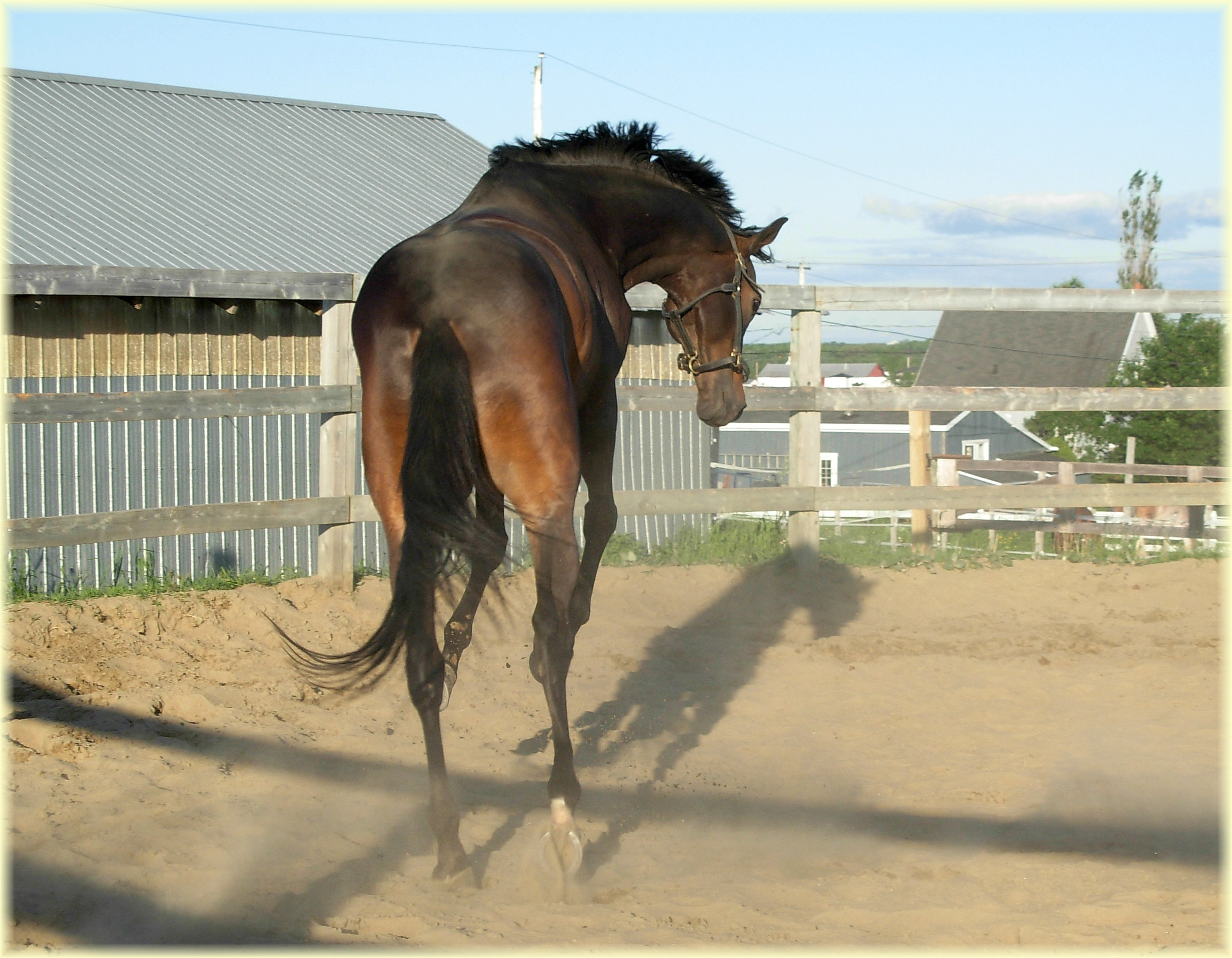
A horse having free exercise in an outdoor round pen

== Uses ==
The round pen allows greater interaction between horse and handler and more control over the horse because the horse cannot fully avoid its human handler. It is used for many forms of training, including ground work such as longeing and liberty work, or for riding. It may also be used for turnout and free exercise. It is most often used today for the purpose of training young horses, though is also used for exercising or riding mature horses and a place for the first rides of a beginning rider who is controlling his or her own horse for the first time. More experienced horses may be ridden in a round pen in situations where control or focus are particularly desired.

== See also ==
- Bullpen
- Longeing
- Horse walker
- Riding hall
