= Tack shop =

Equestrian supply store

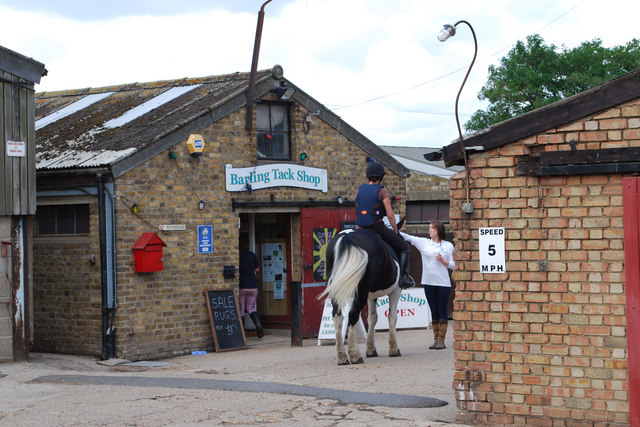
A tack shop in Southchurch, England

A tack shop is an equestrian supply store. Buyers may purchase various pieces of riding equipment and training aids, as well as boots and riding apparel, stable equipment, horse care products, grooming supplies, horse blankets and sheets, model horses, and equine books, magazines, and videos. In many cases, individual tack shops are geared to a certain type of riding, such as English, Western-style, or Saddle seat. Online tack shops also provide many of the same products to their buyers. Tack shops are often run in conjunction with equestrian facilities.

In many tack shops, the hired staff is knowledgeable and may recommend the appropriate piece of equipment or product to a buyer. Additionally, some tack shops offer services such as saddle fitting and tack repair.

In general, horse feed and hay is not sold in tack shops. However supplements generally are offered.
