= Longeing =

Method of training and exercising horses

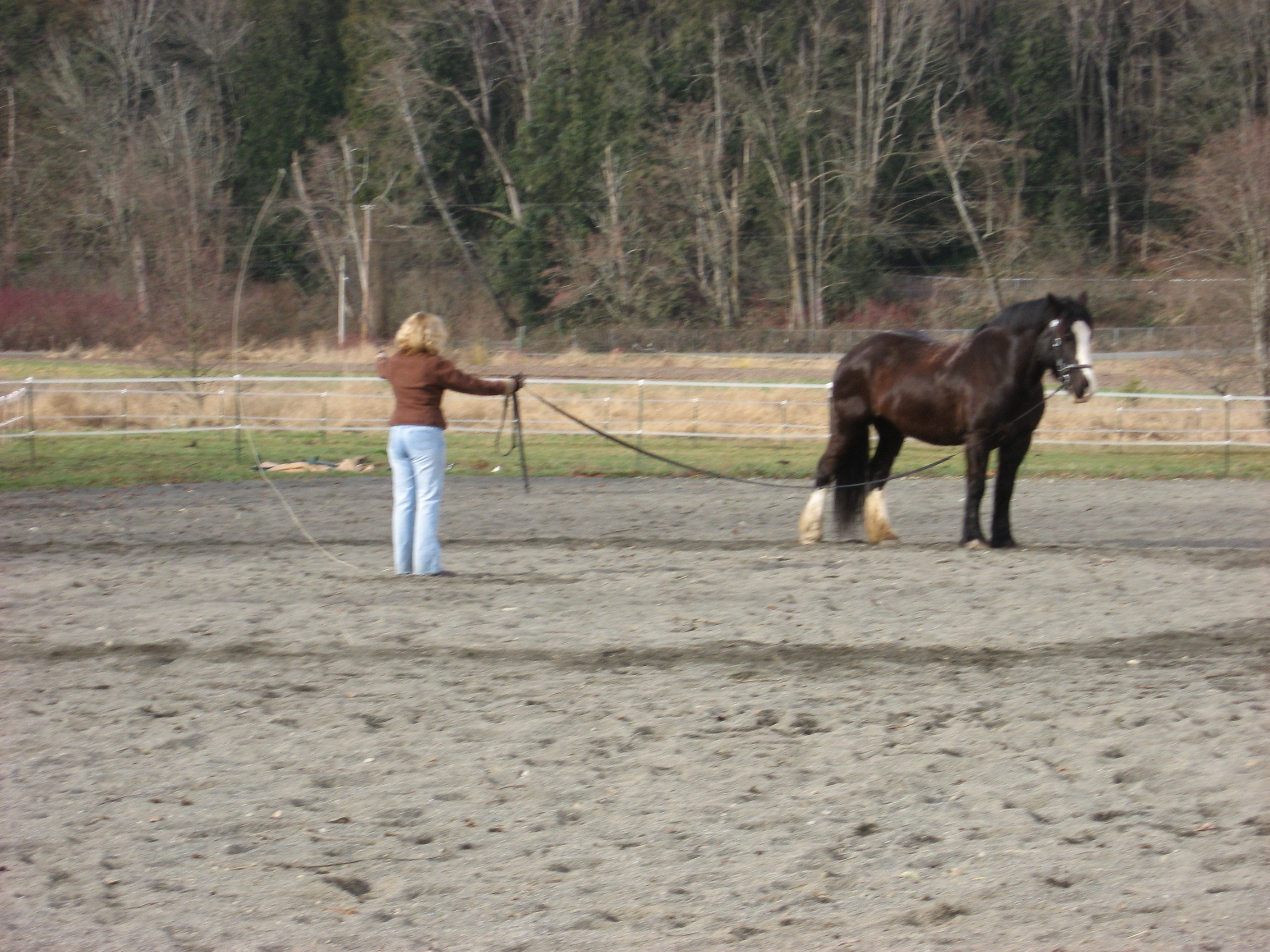
A horse in training for equestrian vaulting at the halt on a longe line

Longeing /ˈlʌndʒɪŋ/ (US English, classical spelling) or lungeing (UK English, informal US) is a technique for training and exercising horses where the horse travels in a circle around the handler. It is also a critical component of the sport of equestrian vaulting.

The horse is asked to work at the end of a long line of approximately 25 feet (7.6 m). Longeing is performed on a large circle with the horse traveling around the outside edge of a real or imaginary ring with the handler on the ground in the center, holding the line. The horse is asked to respond to commands from the handler or trainer, usually given by voice, aided by pressure and release of the line and movement of a whip with a long shaft and equally long lash, called a longeing whip or longe whip.

Longeing is used as a training tool for young horses to introduce them to commands, equipment, and to build trust and respect in the trainer. It can also be used to good effect to build strength in ridden horses or for rehabilitation after illness or injury. It can be used to introduce new riders to the movement of a horse without having the rider also have to manage control of the animal. It also can be an advanced riding exercise to increase balance and skill of more experienced riders.

== Etymology ==
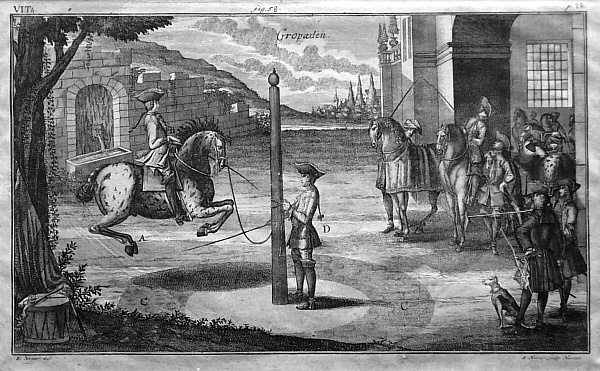
17th century copperplate engraving of a horse and rider being worked on a longe line

The word derives from the French word allonge, meaning "to lengthen", and the Latin longa ("long"). The spellings longe and lunge are interchangeable in English, but longe is more common in the USA and lunge is more common in the UK. The usage of the spelling lungeing in English dates back at least to the 1800s.

== Reasons for longeing ==
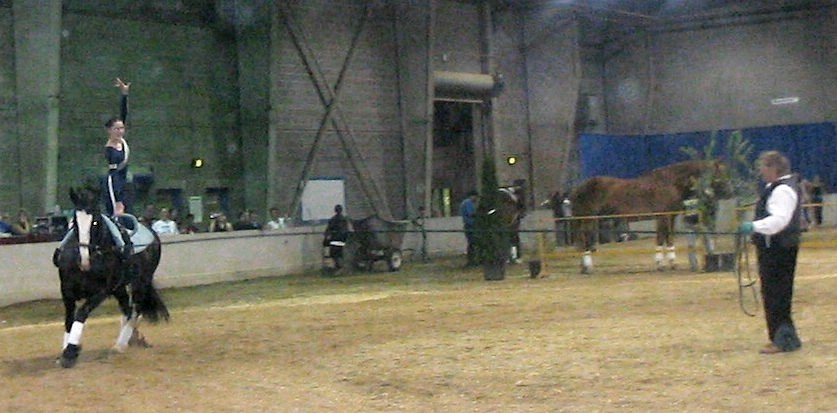
A horse and vaulter on a longe line with handler on the ground. (In vaulting, the handler is called a longeur.) The longe is also used to develop a person's equestrian skills.

Longeing has many benefits for both horses and riders.

For a young or green (inexperienced) horse, longeing is used to teach a horse to respond to voice commands and the trainer's body language, to accustom them to the feel of a saddle and bridle, and to begin their introduction to the feel of reins and bit pressure. In many training stables, a horse is first introduced on the longe to nearly everything it is going to be asked to do under saddle, including movement at all gaits, response to hand and voice commands (called riding aids), and remaining calm in unusual or stressful situations.

On horses of any age or level of experience, longeing is used to exercise a horse when it cannot be ridden, or when additional work is needed to develop balance, rhythm, and to improve the horse's gaits. It is also useful to help settle a horse before riding, especially a high-strung horse, a young horse, or a horse that has been confined more than usual. However, longeing for long periods or with the intent to tire a horse out can cause joint strain. It can be used to "blow off steam" or "get the bucks out" before a rider gets on, though proper turnout or liberty work is a better alternative, because a longeing session is training time, not play time.

Longeing riders is valuable for teaching, as they may develop their seat and position without having to worry about controlling the horse. Classical schools of riding and training, such as the Spanish Riding School, require new riders to work extensively on the longe before they are allowed reins or stirrups, and riders are required to periodically return to longe work to refine their seat and balance.

== Equipment for longeing ==
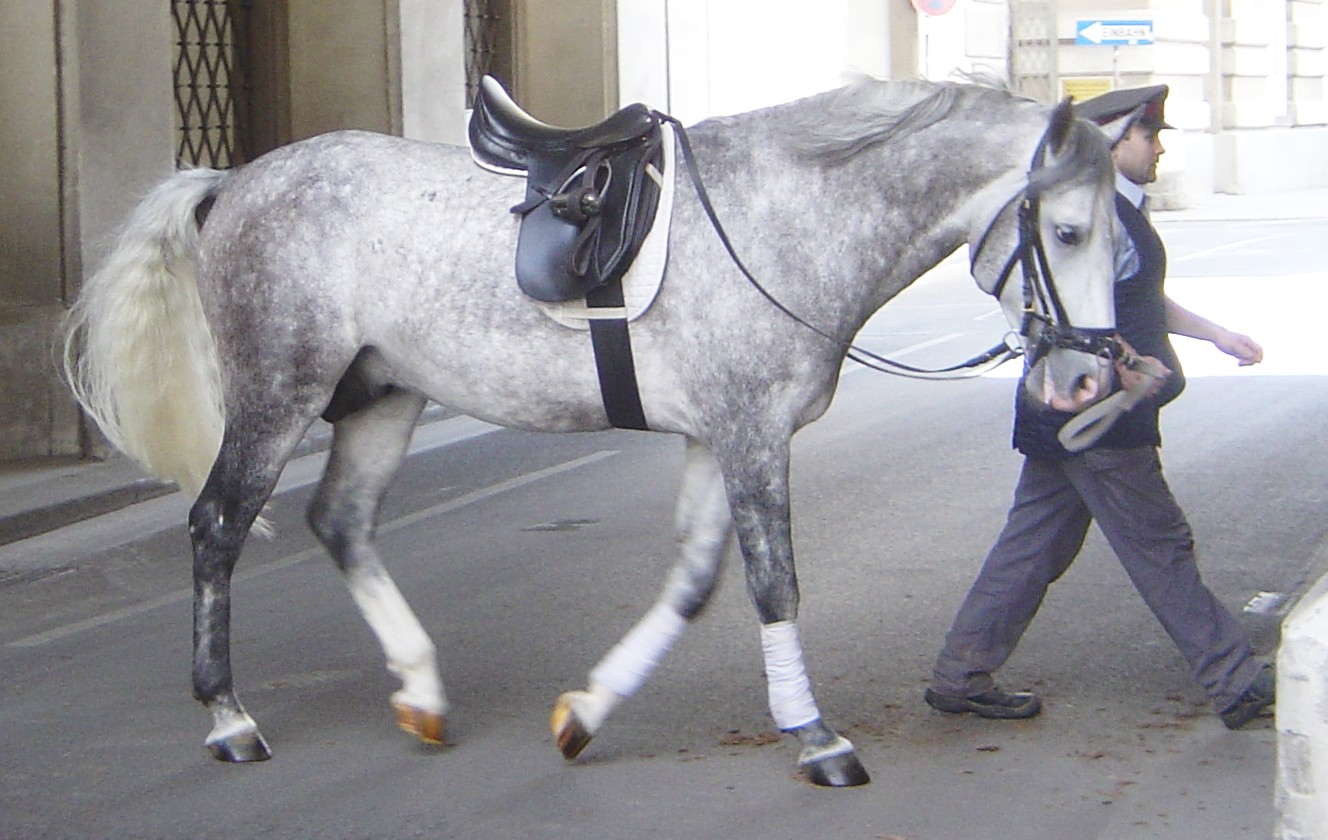
Longe cavesson fitted with a bridle. Leg wraps on the front legs and stirrups run up the leathers are protective measures.

=== Longe line ===
The longe line (or longe) is typically about 25 to 30 feet (7.6 to 9.1 m) long, so the longeing circle can have a diameter of up to 60 feet (18 m). The line is usually a flat woven webbing made of nylon, cotton, or similar material. In the natural horsemanship tradition, the longe line is usually made of round cotton rope, and is often much shorter, as short as 12–15 feet (3.7–4.6 m). In general, cotton longe lines are less likely to burn the handler’s hands than nylon, but nylon is more durable and less likely to break.

It may have a snap, buckle, or chain on one end to attach to a longeing cavesson or bridle. A chain, although sometimes used with difficult horses, has no subtlety of contact and is quite severe. In most cases, it is best to use a snap-end longe line. Many longe lines have a loop handle at the other end, but this is dangerous to use, as a person's hand can be trapped in the handle and be injured should the horse bolt.

The longe line takes the place of the rein aids while longeing. It can be held in a rein hold (coming out the bottom of the hand) or a driving hold (coming out the top of the hand), and the extra line is folded back and forth rather than coiled, as coiled line can tighten and trap the trainer's hand or fingers if the horse bolts.

=== Longe whip ===
The whip usually has a stock of 6 feet (1.8 m), with a lash of 5–6 feet (1.5–1.8 m) (although some are longer). The whip is light, easy to handle, and well balanced. Although the lash can reach the horse, the length reduces the force that can be applied, so it is used as an encouragement to the horse and not as a punishment. Techniques used include movement, brushing the horse with the lash, and in limited circumstances, sound from a whipcrack. It is not safe to use a riding or driving whip for longeing because they are too short to reach the horse without bringing the handler close enough to the horse's hindquarters to risk being kicked by the horse.

=== Longeing cavesson ===
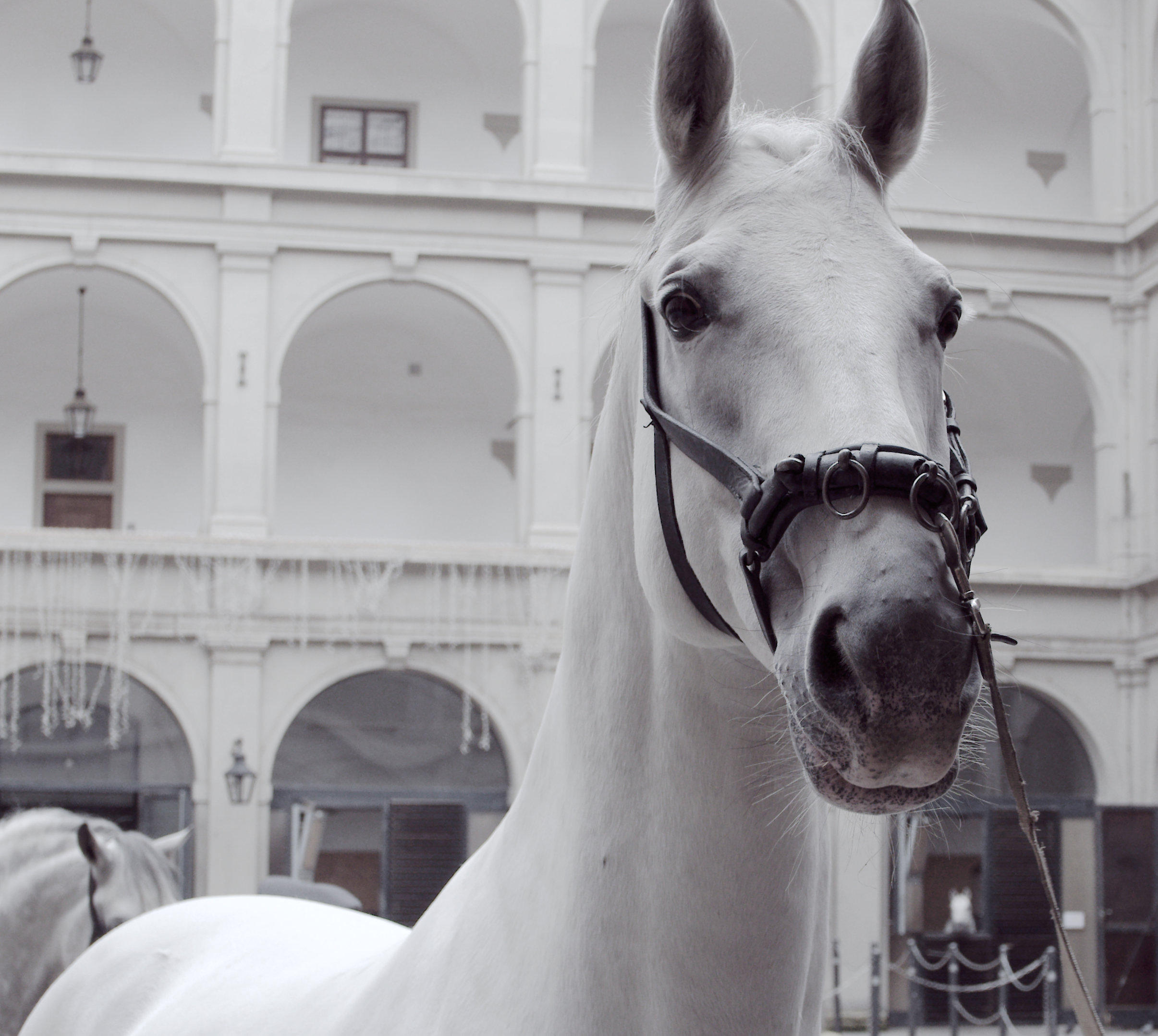
A longeing cavesson

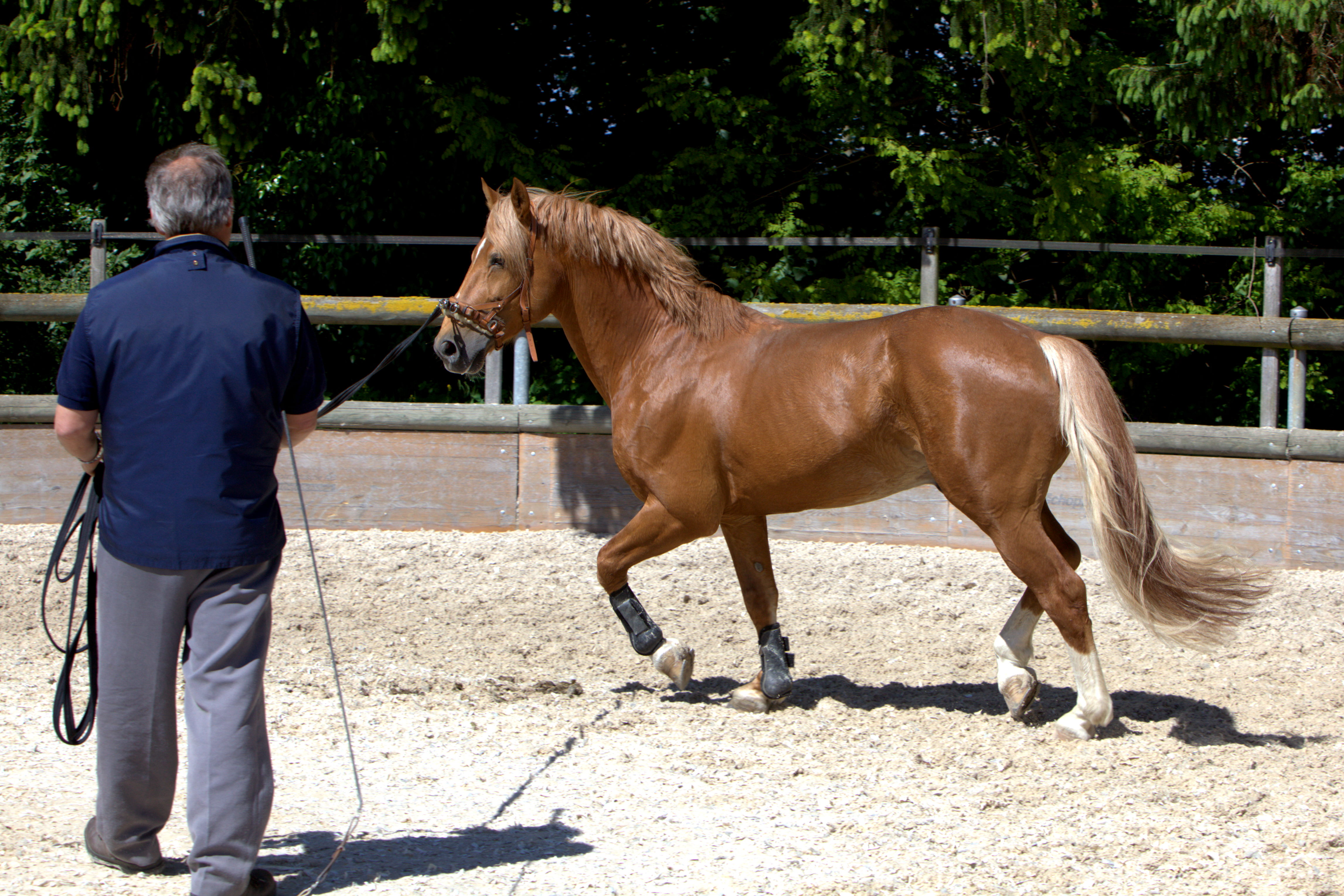
A horse wearing a longeing cavesson

A longeing cavesson (alternate spelling caveson) is the classic headgear specialized for longeing, but in modern times is not the most commonly used equipment. It is a type of headstall with one to three rings on the noseband to which the longe line is attached. The most common point of attachment is the center ring at the top of the cavesson, which allows the horse to go both directions without having to stop and change the adjustment of the line. The two side rings are occasionally used for attachment of the longe line, but more often are used for attachment of side reins or long lines.

The classic design is made of leather. The noseband is usually metal on top with padding beneath, providing good control of the horse, but no risk of injury to the head. Unlike a bridle, there is no chance of damaging the horse's mouth. Newer designs are made of nylon web, similar to some types of halter, with three rings and fleece padding underneath the noseband, often without the metal component. This style is less bulky, less expensive, and available in a very wide range of sizes, but without adequate stiffness to the noseband, may offer less precise control.

A longeing cavesson may be used with or without a bridle. When used with a bridle containing a snaffle bit, the noseband of the bridle is removed, and the bridle goes over the longeing cavesson, to prevent pinching. The bridle cheekpieces sometimes need to be lengthened so that the bit still rests correctly in the mouth.

When fitting a longe cavesson, the noseband must be on the nasal bone of the horse's nose, not on the cartilage. Nosebands that are too low are very uncomfortable for the horse and, in extreme cases, can cause damage to the cartilage if misused. The throatlatch of the cavesson must be snug enough to keep it from slipping over the horse's eye, or from falling off altogether, but not so tight as to restrict the windpipe if the horse flexes its neck properly in response to pressure from the bit and side reins. Some designs replace the throatlatch with a strap that is placed further down the cheek so as to not interfere with the windpipe when adjusted snugly.

=== Use of a bridle alone ===
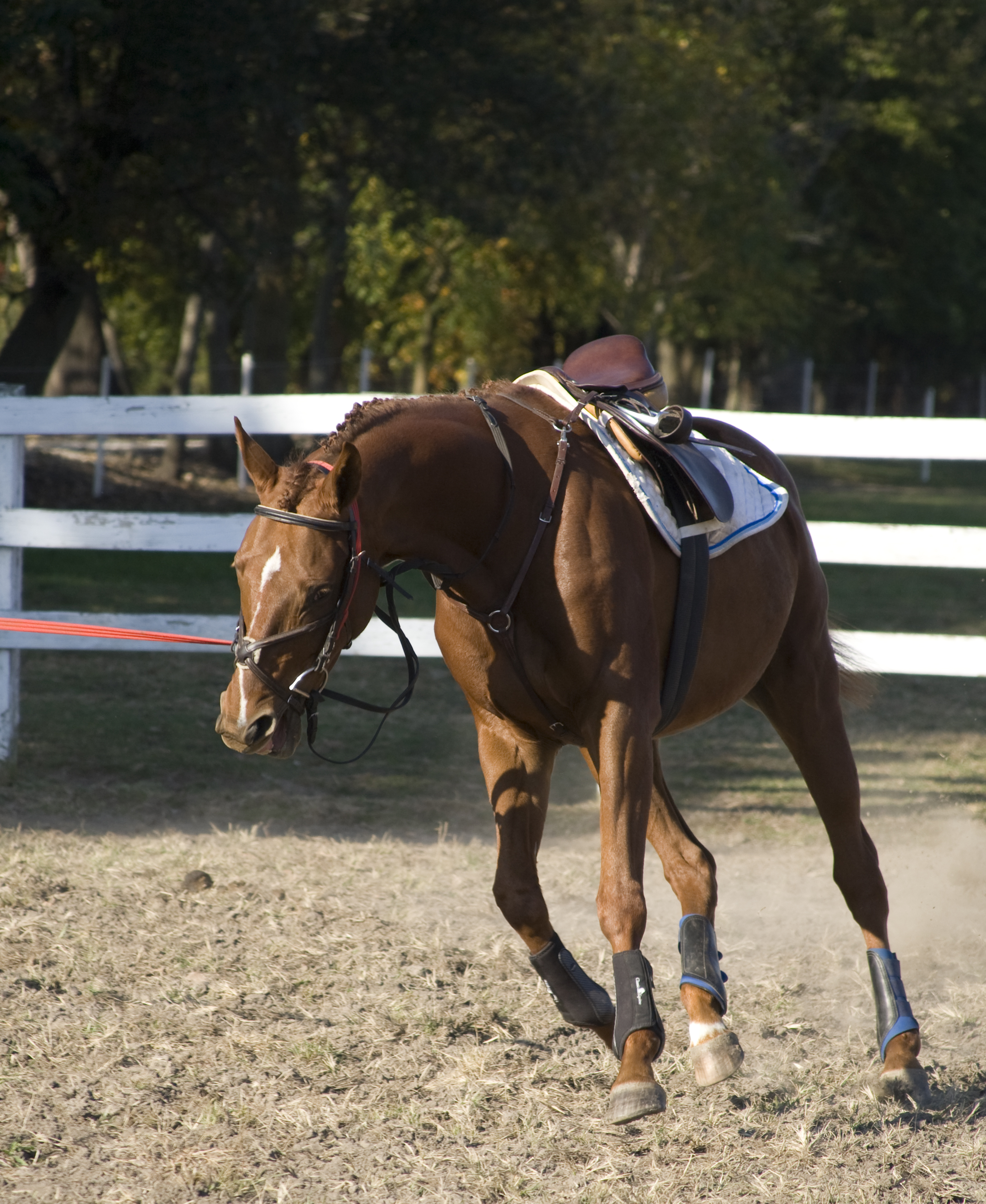
A horse being longed in a bridle

On a well-trained horse, a bridle may be used instead of a longeing cavesson. However, it is possible to injure a horse's mouth if the line is incorrectly attached or misused. Some sensitive horses may react badly to the attachment of the line to the bit, and some classical dressage masters considered this method to be crude.

The bit used is a snaffle bit. Curb bits, having bit shanks of any kind are dangerous; the line can tangle in them, causing injury to the horse's mouth. When longed off a bridle, the reins are kept out of the way, either by removing them, or by twisting them once or twice over the neck and then running the throatlatch of the bridle under the reins before buckling it.

The correct method is to run the longe line through the inside bit ring, over the poll, and attach it to the outside bit ring. This method of attaching the line requires it to be changed each time the horse changes direction. This method has a slight gag effect, raising the bit up and applying pressure on the corners of the mouth and placing pressure on the poll, but puts less lateral pressure on the bit. It is best for horses that pull, or when the trainer is longeing a rider, to ensure maximum control of the horse.

If the longe line is attached just to the inside bit ring, the outside ring can slide through the mouth when the line is pulled and damage the horse's mouth. If the line is run through the inside bit ring, under the chin, and attached to the outside bit ring, the bit can pinch the horse's jaw, and it alters the action of the bit to put pressure on the roof of the horse's mouth. When a method of attachment causes more pain than control, the horse often resists the pressure and will not perform properly.

=== Halter ===
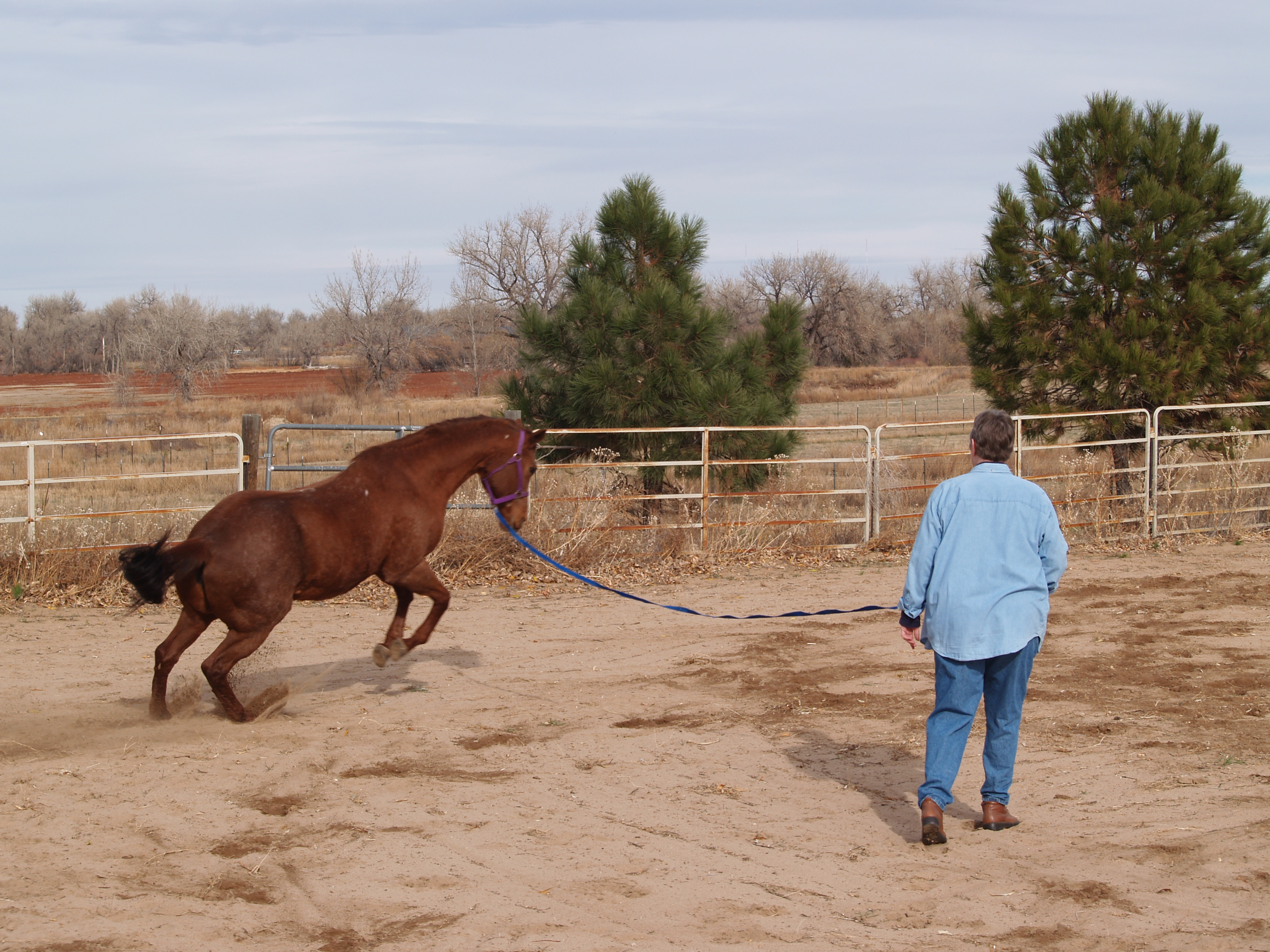
Longeing with a halter offers very little control, but may be suitable for basic exercise. This handler would have additional control if the longe line was attached to the side ring rather than under the jaw.

A halter is used for basic exercise when a longeing cavesson or a bridle is not available. It offers very little control, less finesse, and does not give signals as clearly. When used with a bridle, the halter is placed on over the bridle. This sometimes is done when warming up a horse just prior to competition. The longe line is attached to the inside side ring of the halter noseband on a flat web halter, not the ring under the jaw. If it is attached under the jaw, not only is the halter apt to twist and slip out of place, possibly rubbing the horse in the eye and risking injury, but if the horse is disobedient, the handler has virtually no lateral leverage or control. Some rope halters have knots placed on the noseband and crownpiece that may apply some additional pressure if a longe line is placed under the jaw, which is the only place possible on a rope halter.

=== Protective boots or bandages ===
Horses' legs are often protected while longeing, as they are more likely to interfere when on a circle. Both bell boots and brushing boots are often put on the front legs. Brushing boots are sometimes on the hind legs as well. Leg wraps are sometimes used instead of brushing boots.

=== Saddles and surcingles ===
A saddle is often worn when a horse is longeing. In these circumstances, it is important that the stirrups do not bang against the horse's side. On an English saddle, the stirrups are "run up." To do this, run up the stirrups as they are kept when the saddle is off the horse, then bring the loop of stirrup leather around the stirrup iron before bringing it under the back branch and attaching looping the end of the leather (with the holes in it) through the stirrup leather keeper. Stirrups on a western saddle cannot be run up, so they are usually tied together under the belly of the horse with a piece of twine or rope, though for a very skittish young horse they also can be thrown up over the top of the saddle and tied down in that fashion.

A surcingle or roller is a padded band that straps around the horse's girth area, and has rings around on its side for side reins, or long reins or other training equipment, such as an overcheck. It may also be used on a young horse to get it used to girth pressure. It may be used with or without an English saddle underneath.

=== Side reins ===
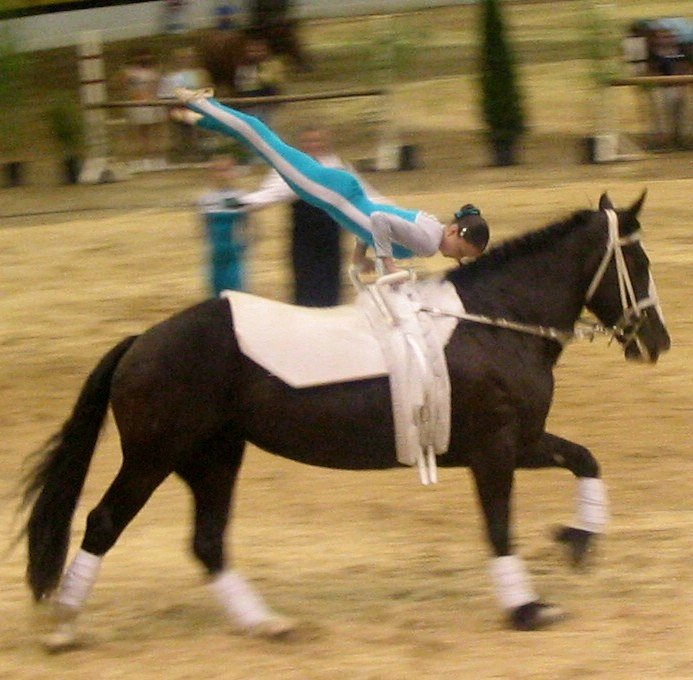
A horse properly equipped for vaulting with surcingle, leg wraps, side reins, and longeing cavesson

Side reins are usually used for more advanced horses. They give the horse something to take contact with, encourage balance and correct head carriage, help develop self-carriage, and keep the horse from putting its head too low. Side reins may be attached from the bit to the surcingle rings, or from the bit to the billets of the girth.

Side reins are adjusted longer for less-experienced horses, and gradually shortened, and raised higher (from point of shoulder up to the point of hip) as a horse becomes better trained. For green horses, the side reins are adjusted so that the horse can take contact with the bit, but does not have to flex beyond its abilities. A good starting point is to adjust the reins so the green horse carries its head approximately 4 inches in front of the vertical. In any case, the head is not to be pulled behind the vertical.

Side reins are adjusted so they are the same length on either side, or slightly shorter on the inside. Side reins adjusted too tightly can cause a horse to go behind the bit, deaden the mouth and in extreme cases cause the horse to feel trapped, leading to rearing and the possibility that the horse will flip over.

A horse is warmed up and cooled down without the side reins, allowing the neck to stretch down and the back muscles to relax. Side reins are most useful for work in the trot and canter, where the neck, back and hindquarter muscles are engaged. Working a horse in side reins at the walk actually discourages a relaxed, forward-moving gait. Side reins are not used for jumping, as they restrict the use of the neck too much, and may even cause the horse to fall.

=== Equipment for the trainer ===
Wearing gloves when longeing prevents rope burns if the horse pulls the line hard. Proper boots are also necessary, and at a minimum, shoes with an enclosed toe are a must. A helmet is also sometimes worn, especially if the horse tends to kick at the trainer. It is wise not to wear spurs, which can get caught on the line and cause the trainer to trip.

== Use of the aids ==
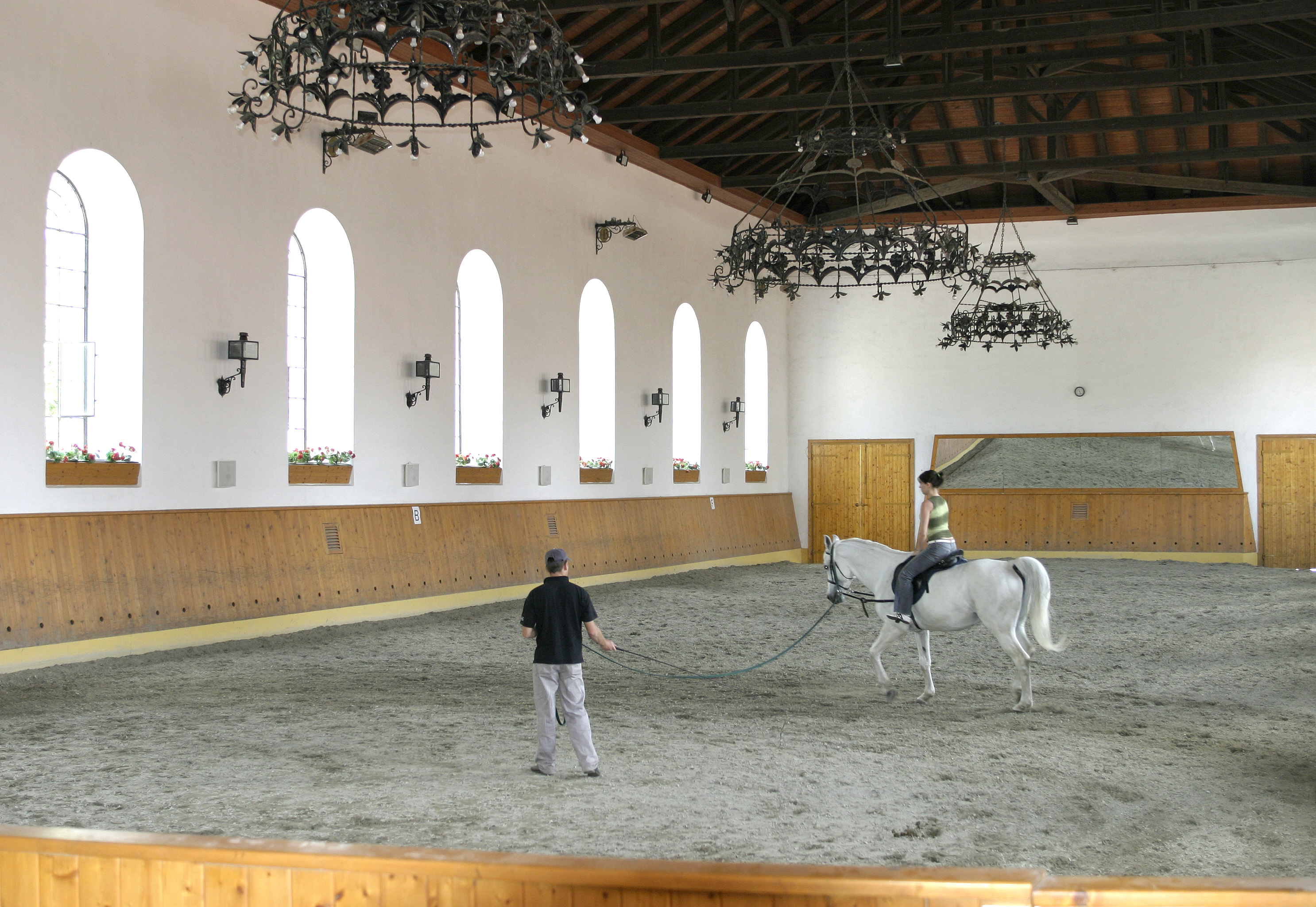
Rider being longed on a horse by a riding instructor

=== Longe line ===
The longe line takes the place of the rider's rein aids. It may be held like a riding rein, with the line running to the horse held between the fourth and fifth finger, or held like a driving rein, with it running between the thumb and pointer finger. The elbow is softly bent, with the arm at an approximately 90-degree angle. The horse and handler should not pull, jerk, or "hang" on the line. Like rein aids while riding, signals are given smoothly and as softly as possible to get the desired response, with aids given by squeezing or turning the hand.

The longe line traveling from the horse to the hand is held in the hand in which direction the horse is moving (so if the horse is working clockwise to the right, the right hand is the leading hand). The extra longe line is folded, never coiled, in the other hand. If the horse were to take off, a coiled line could tighten around the trainer's hand, dragging the trainer and possibly leading to life-threatening injuries. Large loops could be stepped on or caught on something.

- Opening rein: where the lead hand moves to the side and out, away from the trainer's body. It helps to lead the horse forward.
- Direct rein: a squeeze and release on the line backwards helps to keep the horse from moving out on the circle, causes the horse to bend inward, or asks the horse to make the circle smaller.
- Indirect rein: where the longe hand moves back and sideways towards the other hip. It asks the horse to slow or halt.
- Giving the longe: briefly releasing the line towards the horse's head, before re-establishing contact. Acts as a reward, asks the horse to lower its head, or asks the horse to move out onto a larger circle. The line should not drag or become very loose when this is performed.
- Vibrating: several short, brief squeezes of the longe line. Used to halt or slow the horse down without pulling.
- Half-halting: as in riding, it is used for re-balancing the horse, calling the animal's attention to the trainer, and preparing it for a command. Must be used in conjunction with the whip and voice.

=== Whip ===
The longe whip takes the place of the rider's legs, asking the horse to move forward or out. It is held with the tip low, pointing towards the horse's hocks, with the lash dragging on the ground. The whip is held in the hand that the horse is not going (so if the horse were going to the right, the whip would be held in the lunger's left hand). The horse is to accept the whip as an aid, and not be fearful. When the handler goes toward the horse to adjust equipment, the lash is caught up and the whip turned backward, under the arm, so that it does not interfere with the horse.

- Pointing the whip at the shoulder is used to make the horse move out or stops him from moving inward on the circle.
- Pointing the whip, and making a forward rotating movement, at the hocks asks the horse to increase speed or impulsion.
- Pointing the whip in front of the head, going under the longe line, can be used to ask a horse to slow or halt.
- Cracking the whip is reserved for extreme cases, such as a horse that refuses to move forward. If overused, the horse may begin to ignore it. Cracking upsets some horses. If a crack is needed, it is done behind the hindquarters.
- Touching the horse with the lash is used to make the horse move strongly forward. The lash is usually applied where the rider's leg would be, in the girth area. It may also be used on the hindquarters, although this causes some horses to kick, or on the shoulder, to prevent the horse from running inward. It is usually used only lightly, in an upward motion.

=== Voice ===
The voice is used in the same manner as when riding. It is used mainly for transitions, praise, or to express displeasure. Although the voice is not commonly used for riding, it is very important in longeing. However, overuse of voice to encourage impulsion will cause a horse to ignore the trainer. Voice commands used in longeing are identical to voice commands used when leading or riding the horse, but more voice commands are used when longeing than at other times. All words used in transitions for longeing are spoken slowly, clearly and each command should be phonetically distinct from and others. For upward transitions the voice might raise to a higher pitch, downward transitions should lower the pitch. A trainer may cluck or make another type of chirping or kissing sound to increase speed or impulsion.

- A word, such as the name of the horse, or simply a word like "and..." can be used as a "half-halt," essentially to warn the horse that a command is coming. A word other than whoa is used to calm a horse (such as "easy" or "steady"), spoken in a low tone and calm manner. Similarly, a word such as "quit!" can be spoken in a displeased tone when the horse misbehaves; as "no" can be confused with "whoa" by the horse. A word for praise (such as "good boy") can be used if horse responds correctly to a command.

== Longe area ==
It is safest to longe in an enclosed area. If the horse escapes, it will be easier to catch, and an enclosed area will make him easier to control on the longe. Ideally, a 60 to 70-foot (20–25 m) round pen is used. However, the corner of any enclosed arena or small field may also be used. For safety, it is best if there is no one riding in the longeing area.

The footing should not be slippery, to help prevent slipping and injuries. The ground should be relatively flat for the horse's balance. The circle should be large (approx. 20 meters), as smaller circles tend to increase strain on the horse's joints and ligaments.

== Roundpenning, liberty work and "free longeing" ==
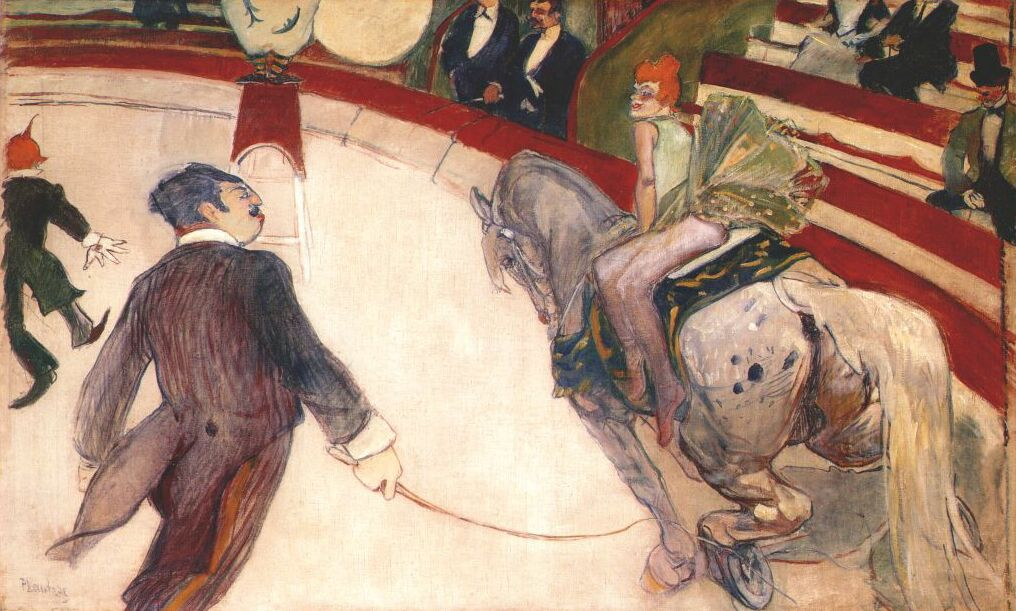
Liberty work at a circus. Henri Toulouse-Lautrec, c. 1887-88

In the field of natural horsemanship, it is a common practice to work a horse loose in a round pen 40 to 70 feet (12 to 21 m) in diameter. (50 to 60 feet (15 to 18 m) feet is considered standard). This is sometimes called free longeing or work at liberty, because the horse is asked to travel in a circle and obey commands without a longe line attached. The handler uses voice, body language and a lariat or a longe whip to give commands to the horse, eventually teaching it to speed up, slow down, stop and change direction on command.

A variation of these techniques are also used by circus trainers to train horses and other animals, such as elephants to work in a ring for exhibition purposes. Both single animals and groups of animals can be trained to perform at liberty.

These types of liberty work are considered schooling disciplines and to simply turn a horse loose in a small pen and make it run around to get exercise is not free longeing.

== Time limits ==
Work in small circles is stressful on a horse's legs, so it is best to limit a longeing session to about 20 minutes. Gaits should be changed frequently, and the horse should be worked for equal time in both directions so that both sides of the horse are worked evenly and to keep the work interesting for the horse.

== See also ==
- Horse training
- Horse tack
- Longeing cavesson
- Round pen
