= Livery yard =

Pay-to-use stable

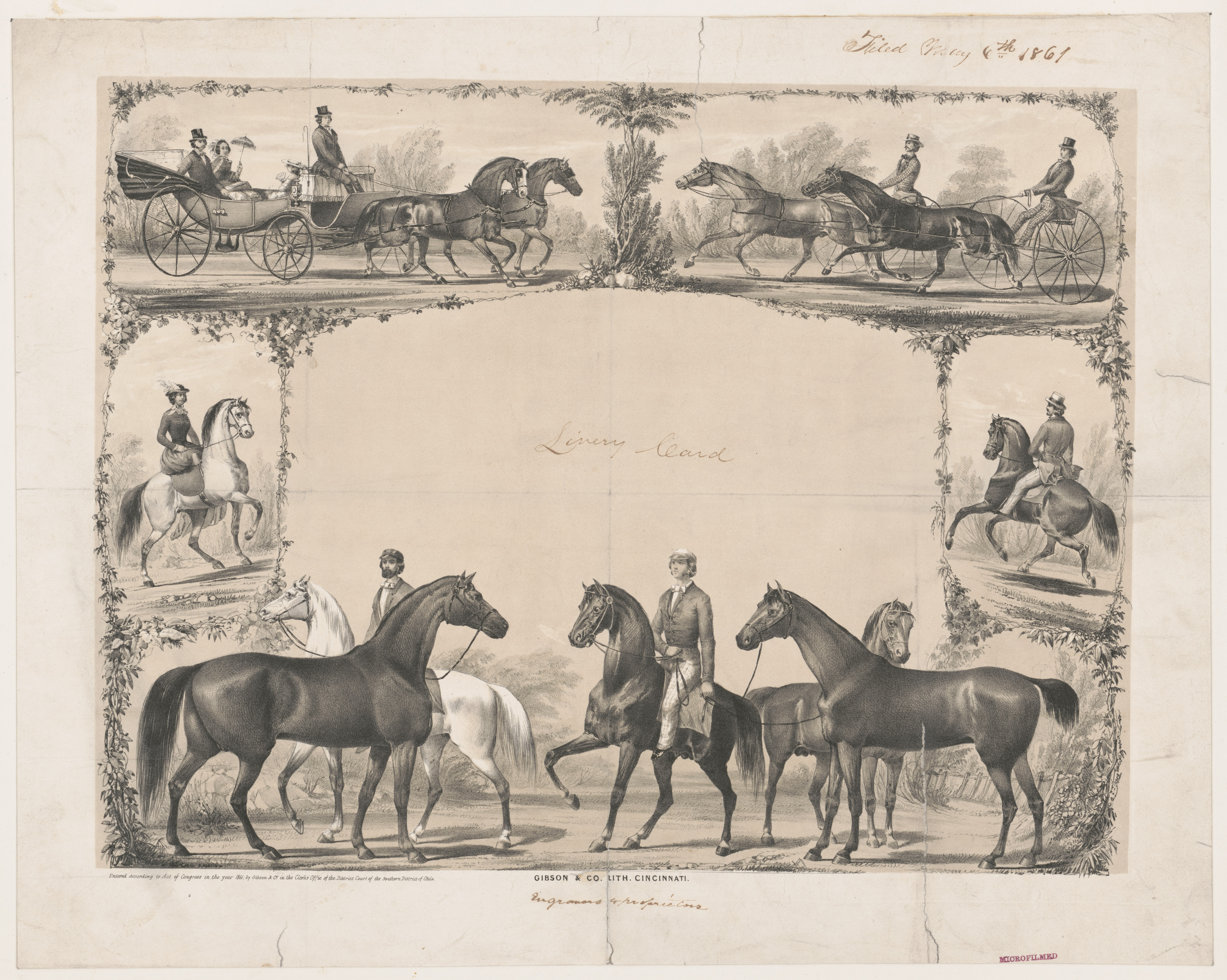
Card advertising livery stables, printer's sample, Cincinnati, 1861

A livery yard, livery stable or boarding stable, is a stable where horse owners pay a weekly or monthly fee to keep their horses. A livery or boarding yard is not usually a riding school and the horses are not normally for hire (unless on working livery - see below). Facilities at a livery yard normally include a loose box or stable and access for the horse to graze on grass.

== History of livery stables in North America ==
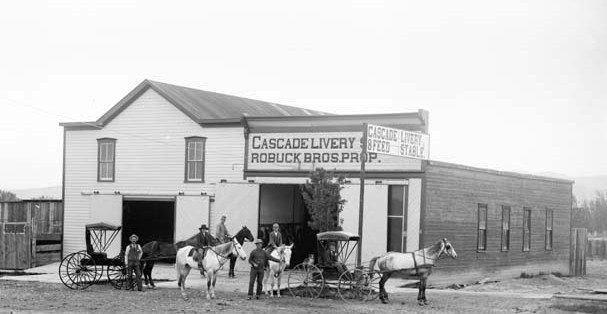
Cascade Livery, Feed and Stable, Montrose, Colorado, circa 1900

Historically in North America, "livery stable" had a somewhat different meaning: a stable where horses, teams and wagons were for hire, but also where privately owned horses could be boarded for a short time. Because of the temporary boarding aspect, livery stables were often attached to a hotel or boarding house. Located at Buffalo, New York, the C. W. Miller Livery Stable is an example of a multi-story livery stable.

The livery stable was a necessary institution of every American town, but its role has been generally overlooked by historians. In addition to providing vital transportation service, the livery usually also sold hay, grain, coal, and wood. Because of the stench, noise, and vermin that surrounded the livery, cities and towns attempted to control their locations and activities. Often the scene of gambling, cockfighting, and stag shows, they were condemned as sources of vice. With the advent of the automobile after 1910, the livery stables quietly disappeared.

== Types of livery ==
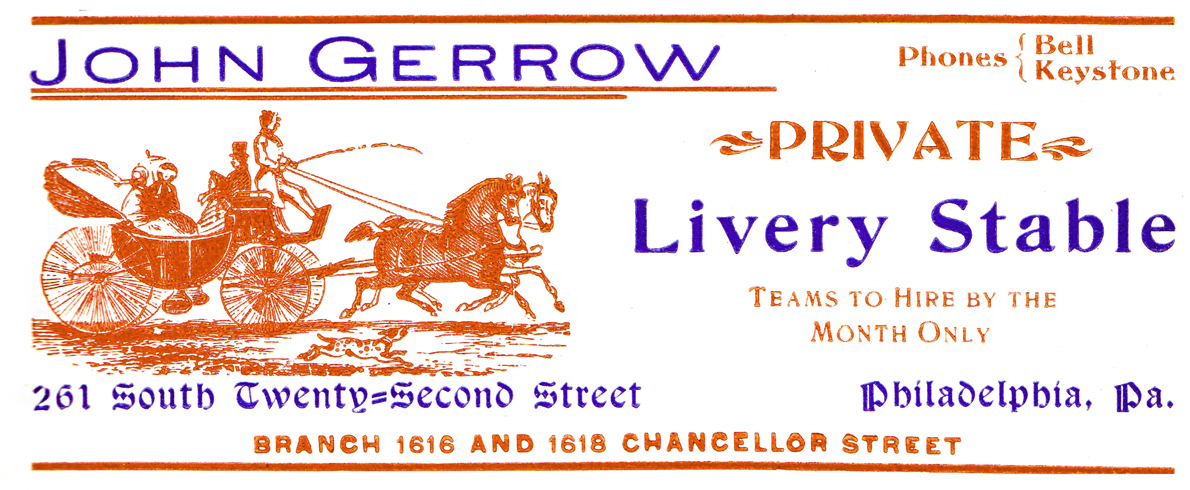
Livery stable ad, 1905

- Full livery – The staff undertake all care of the horse and often exercise or even compete the horse on behalf of the owner. This is normally the most expensive option.
- Part livery – The horse is normally fed, watered, and the stall or loose box is mucked out (cleaned) on behalf of the owner. It is not trained or exercised.
- Do it yourself or DIY livery – A stall in the stable and paddock or field are usually provided. The owner undertakes all care of the horse and provides all hay, feed and bedding. This is usually the least expensive option. Sometimes an amount of hay and/or straw for bedding is included in the fee. The horse owner or a paid worker will visit the yard one or more times a day to care for the horse.
- Grass livery or agistment – A form of DIY livery in which a field or paddock is provided, often with a field shelter, but without stabling. Grass livery is often usable only during drier weather or during the grass-growing season. Horses must be stabled elsewhere in other seasons. This arrangement is similar to the owner renting a field or paddock for the horse, but fees are charged per horse rather than by the size of the field; also different owners' animals may be mixed. The horse owners are not responsible for maintenance of the fences and other facilities.
- Working livery – Working liveries are particularly common at riding schools. The horse owner may pay a discounted livery fee if the riding school is permitted to use the horse for students to ride in lessons.

== American horse boarding ==
In the United States, terminology is less defined and varies by region. Boarding usually falls into one of the following categories:

- Full board: Generally includes all food, water, stabling, stall-cleaning, and, sometimes, daily turnout for exercise. In a few locations, particularly in the eastern US, "full board" may also encompass grooming and riding of the horse, but this is not a common practice nationally. If a horse is groomed, ridden and taken into competition by someone other than the owner, it is usually referred to as "in training" or "at training", and the owner pays additional fees on top of full boarding costs.
- Part or Partial board: The horse is provided shelter, water, stabling, and twice daily feedings of hay. All other care, including feeding of grain, stall-cleaning, grooming and all exercise, is the responsibility of the owner.
- Self-board: Similar to "DIY livery" in the UK. The stabling is provided, and the owner is responsible for all care. In most cases, hay and stall bedding is available for the use of the boarders. In some places, this is included in the term "partial board".
- Pasture board: Essentially the same as "Grass livery" in the UK. Often used year-round in the United States, particularly in the west. In the winter, if there is insufficient grass, some pasture board situations include hay fed to the horses; in other places, the owner must provide all supplemental feeding.

== See also ==
- Equestrian facility
- Horse care
- Livery Stable Blues
- Parking garage
