= Splay =

Splay may refer to:

- Splay, a verb meaning slant, slope or spread outwards
- Splay (physiology), the difference between urine threshold and saturation
- Splay (Japanese band), a J-pop band from Osaka
- Splay Networks, a Sweden-headquartered group of multi-channel networks for Sweden, Finland, Norway, Denmark, and Germany
- In architecture
  - splayed opening, an opening in the wall that broadens on one side
  - chamfer, a beveled edge connecting two surfaces
  - talus (fortification), a sloping face at the base of a fortified wall
- Splay (plastics), off-colored streaking that occurs in injection molded plastics
- Splay tree, a type of search tree
- Splay fault, geology
- Splay leg, a condition in birds and poultry
- Splay (Shiner album), 1996
- Splay (Jim Black album), 2002
