= Hobble =

To hobble means to walk in an impeded manner, as if with a physical disability or injury, or to cause an animal or person to do likewise.

Hobble may also refer to:

- Hobble (device), a device used for restricting the ability to run or to walk, usually for a horse
- Hobble skirt, a skirt with a narrow enough hem to significantly impede the wearer's stride
