= Tmax =

Tmax may refer to:

- TmaxSoft, a South Korean software company
- Kodak T-MAX, photographic film
- Yamaha TMAX, a maxi scooter

== Entertainment ==
- T-max, a South Korean pop band
- T. Max Graham (1941–2011), professional name of American actor Neil Graham Moran

== Pharmacology and physiology ==
- t_{max}, the time it takes a drug or other substance to reach the maximum concentration C_{max}
- T_{max}, abbreviation for transport maximum
