= Transport maximum =

In physiology, transport maximum (alternatively Tm or T_{max}) refers to the point at which increase in concentration of a substance does not result in an increase in movement of a substance across a cell membrane.

In renal physiology, the concept of transport maximum is often discussed in the context of glucose and PAH.

For both substances (as with all substances), the quantity excreted can be determined with the following equation:

- excretion = (filtration + secretion) - reabsorption

The proximal convoluted tubule of the nephron has protein channels that reabsorb glucose, and others that secrete para-aminohippuric acid (PAH). However, its ability to do so is proportionate to the channel proteins available for the transport.

- Glucose is not secreted, so excretion = filtration - reabsorption. Both filtration and reabsorption are directly proportional to the concentration of glucose in the plasma. However, while the average maximum reabsorption is about 375 mg/min in healthy individuals, filtration has effectively no limit (within reasonable physiological ranges.) Therefore, if the concentration rises above 375 mg/min, the body cannot retain all the glucose, leading to glucosuria.
- PAH is not reabsorbed and is secreted, so excretion = filtration + secretion. As with glucose, the transfer is at the proximal tubule, but in the opposite direction: from the peritubular capillaries to the lumen. At low levels, all the PAH is transferred, but at high levels, the transport maximum is reached, and the PAH takes longer to clear.

In practice, the transport maximum is not all-or-nothing. As the concentration approaches the transport maximum, some of the channels are overwhelmed before others are. For example, with glucose, some sugar appears in the urine at levels much lower than 300 mg/dL. The point at which the effects start to appear is called "threshold", and the difference between threshold and transport maximum is called "splay".
