= Horse training =

Methods of teaching behaviors to horses

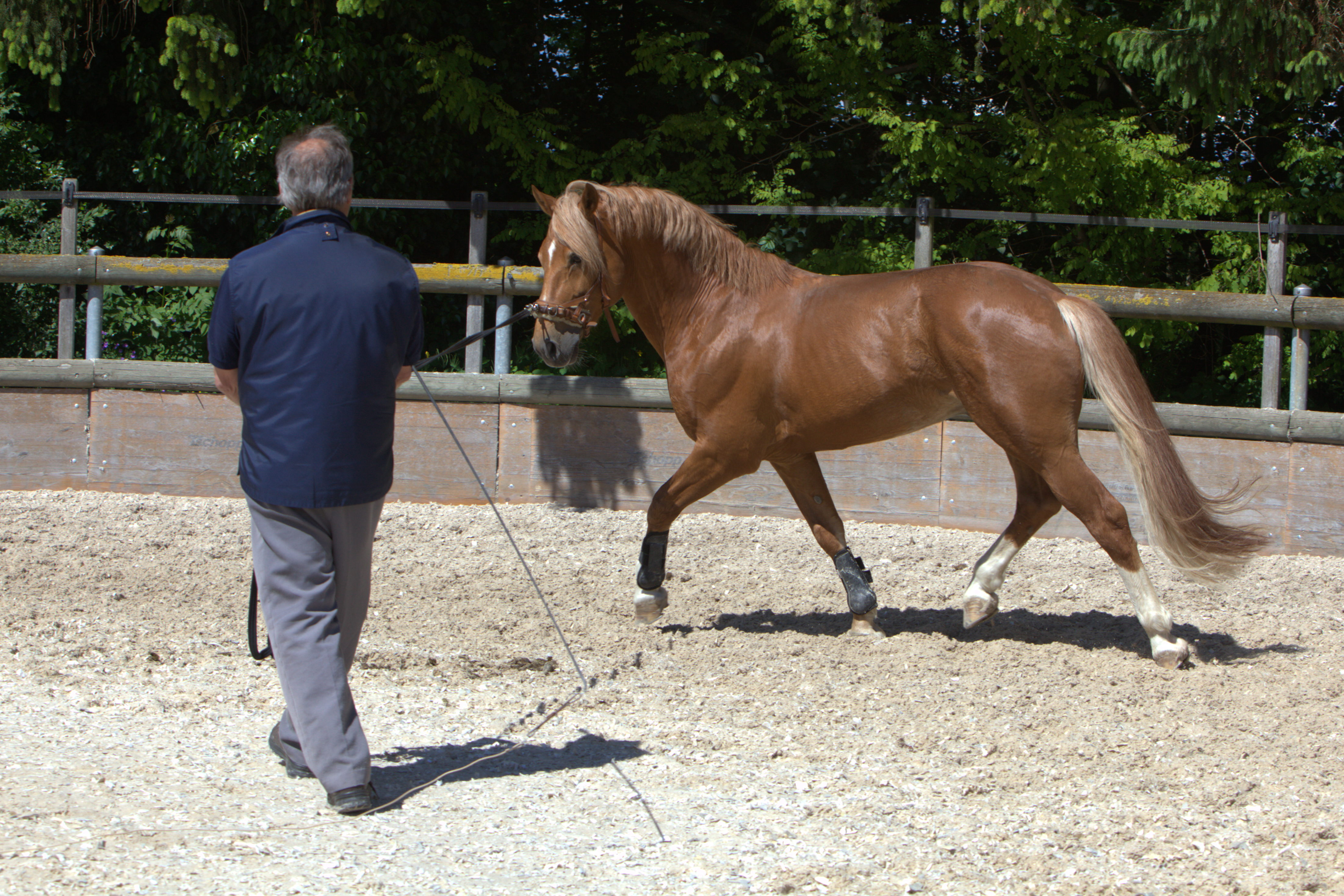
A horse being trained on the longe line

Horse training is the variety of practices that teach horses to perform certain behaviors when commanded to do so by humans. Horses are trained to be manageable by humans for everyday care as well as for equestrian activities, ranging anywhere from equine sports such as horse racing, dressage, or jumping, to therapeutic horseback riding for people with disabilities.

Historically, horses were trained for warfare, farm work, sport and transport purposes. Today, most horse training is geared toward making horses useful for a variety of recreational and sporting equestrian pursuits. Horses are also trained for specialized jobs from movie stunt work to police and crowd control activities, circus entertainment, and equine-assisted psychotherapy.

There is controversy over various methods of horse training and even some of the words used to describe these methods. Some techniques are considered cruel and others are considered humane.

== Goals ==
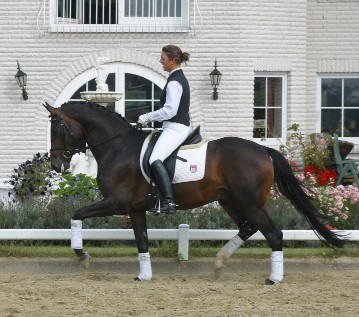
Effective communication and harmony between horse and rider are among the goals of proper training.

The range of training techniques and training goals is large, but basic animal training concepts apply to all forms of horse training. The initial goal of most types of training is to create a horse that is safe for humans to handle (under most circumstances) and able to perform a useful task for the benefit of humans.

A few specific considerations and some basic knowledge of horse behavior help a horse trainer be effective no matter what school or discipline is chosen:

- Safety is paramount: Horses are much larger and stronger than humans, so they must be taught behavior that will not injure people.
- Horses, like other animals, differ in brain structure from humans and thus do not have the same type of thinking and reasoning ability as human beings. Thus, the human has the responsibility to think about how to use the psychology of the horse to lead the animal into an understanding of the goals of the human trainer.
- Horses are social herd animals and, when properly handled, can learn to follow and respect a human leader.
- Horses, as prey animals, have an inborn fight or flight instinct that can be adapted to human needs. Horses need to be taught to rely upon humans to determine when fear or flight is an appropriate response to new stimuli and not to react by instinct alone.
- Like most animals, a young horse will more easily adapt to human expectations than an older one, so human handling of the horse from a very early age is generally advised. That being said, only trainers or those with several years of experience should handle a foal's entire regimen alone.

== Stages ==
Regardless of the desired goal of training, most horses are exposed to a general series of steps that will ultimately prepare them for a designated discipline.

=== Training of foals and younger horses ===
Most young domesticated horses are handled at birth or within the first few days of life, though some are only handled for the first time when they are weaned from their mothers, or dams. Advocates of handling foals from birth sometimes use the concept of imprinting to introduce a foal within its first few days and weeks of life to many of the activities they will see throughout their lives. Within a few hours of birth, a foal being imprinted will have a human touch it all over, pick up its feet, and introduce it to human touch and voice.

Others may leave a foal alone for its first few hours or days, arguing that it is more important to allow the foal to bond with its dam. However, even people who do not advocate imprinting often still place value on handling a foal a great deal while it is still nursing and too small to easily overpower a human. By doing so, the foal should learn that no harm will be done to it at a human's hands (hopefully) and that humans should be respected.

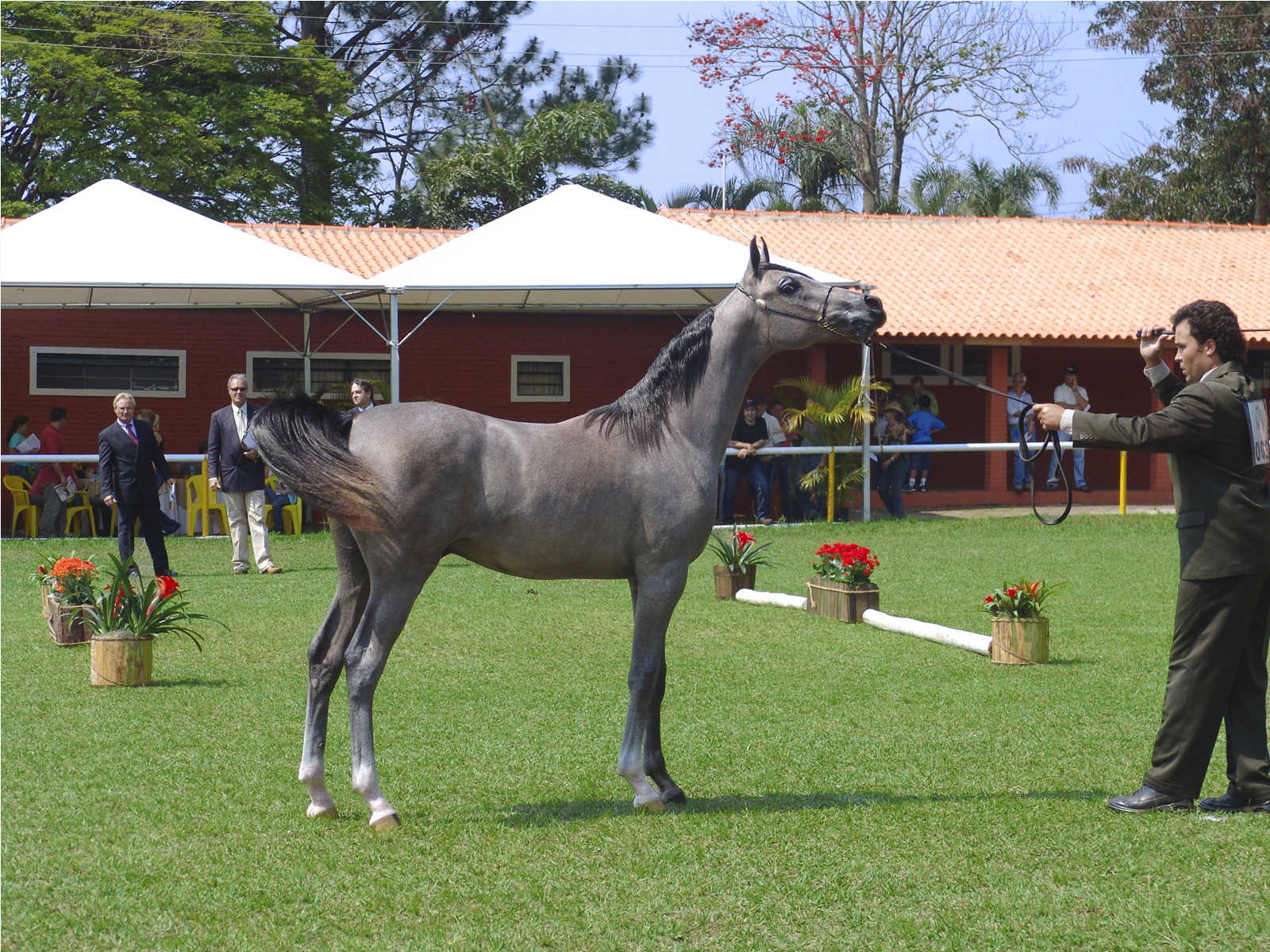
Horses too young to be ridden are trained to accept a halter, taught basic skills, manners, and become accustomed to human activity. Some, like this yearling, are shown in conformation classes.

While a foal is far too young to be ridden, it is still able to learn skills it will need later in life. By the end of a foal's first year, it should be halter-broke, meaning that it allows a halter placed upon its head and has been taught to be led by a human at a walk and trot, to stop on command and to stand tied.

The young horse needs to be calm for basic grooming, as well as veterinary care such as vaccinations and de-worming. A foal needs regular hoof care and can be taught to stand while having its feet picked up and trimmed by a farrier. Ideally a young horse should learn all the basic skills it will need throughout its life, including: being caught from a field, loaded into a horse trailer, and not to fear flapping or noisy objects. It also can be exposed to the noise and commotion of ordinary human activity, including seeing motor vehicles, hearing radios, and so on. More advanced skills sometimes taught in the first year include learning to accept blankets placed on it, to be trimmed with electric clippers, and to be given a bath with water from a hose. The foal may learn basic voice commands for starting and stopping, and sometimes will learn to square its feet up for showing in in-hand or conformation classes. If these tasks are completed, the young horse will have no fear of things placed on its back, around its belly or in its mouth.

Some people, whether through philosophy or simply due to being pressed for time, do not handle foals significantly while they are still nursing, but wait until the foal is weaned from its dam to begin halter breaking and the other tasks of training a horse in its first year. The argument for gentling and halter-breaking at weaning is that the young horse, in crisis from being separated from its dam, will more readily bond with a human at weaning than at a later point in its life. Sometimes the tasks of basic gentling are not completed within the first year but continue when the horse is a yearling. Yearlings are larger and more unpredictable than weanlings, plus often are easily distracted, in part due to the first signs of sexual maturity. However, they also are still highly impressionable, and though very quick and agile, are not at their full adult strength.

Rarer, but not uncommon even in the modern world, is the practice of leaving young horses completely unhandled until they are old enough to be ridden, usually between the age of two and four, and completing all ground training as well as training for riding at the same time. However, waiting until a horse is full grown to begin training is often far riskier for humans and requires considerably more skill to avoid injury.

=== Ground training ===
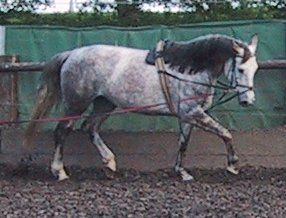
A horse being longed with a surcingle and side reins

After a young horse is taught to lead and other basic skills, various tasks can be introduced to the horse as it matures while it is still too young to be ridden. Some schools of training do a great deal of work with young horses during their yearling and two-year-old years to prepare them for riding, others merely reinforce the basic lessons taught to the horse as a foal and simply keep the horse accustomed to the presence of humans. Occasionally, a young horse does not possess the necessary basic skills described above which would have been taught to it as a foal. Therefore, its adolescent years are spent learning or re-learning basic lessons.

Several ground training techniques are commonly introduced to a young horse some time after it is a year old, but prior to being ridden. All horses usually have some or all of this ground work done prior to being ridden, though the time spent can range from hours to months. While a foal or yearling can be introduced to a small amount of ground work, a young horse's bones and joints are quite soft and fragile. So, to prevent joint and cartilage injury, intense work, particularly intense work in a confined circle (such as advanced roundpenning or longeing), should wait until the horse is at least two years old. Common ground training techniques include:

- Liberty work, sometimes called free longeing, round pen work or roundpenning, but regardless of terminology, is the process of working a loose horse in a small area (usually a round pen 40–60 feet/15–20 meters in diameter) with the handler holding only a long whip or a rope lariat, teaching the horse to respond to the voice and body language of the handler as he or she asks the horse to move faster or slower, to change direction, and to stop.
- Longeing (Lungeing- UK), pronounced "lungeing", the training of a young horse to move in circles at the end of a long rope or line, usually about 25 to 30 feet long.
- Desensitization, sometimes called sacking out, the process of introducing a horse to flapping objects such as blankets, teaching the horse to allow itself to be touched by an object and not to fear things that people move about a horse.
- Introduction to a saddle and bridle or harness, without actually getting on the horse or hooking up a cart.
- Ground driving, also called long-lining, teaching a young horse to move forward with a person walking behind it, a precursor to both harness driving and having reins used by a mounted rider.
- Bitting, the process of accustoming a horse to a bit and bridle, sometimes with the addition of side reins that attach to a saddle, harness, or surcingle (a wide leather or nylon band that goes around the horse's barrel) and accustom the horse to the feel of pressure on the bit.

A horse is not ready to be ridden until it is accustomed to all the equipment that it needs to wear and is responsive to basic voice, and usually rein, commands to start, stop, turn and change gaits.

For some disciplines, ground work is also used to develop specific types of muscling as well as to instill certain behaviors. When ground work incorporates both mental and muscular development, it may take considerably longer for the horse to be ready to be ridden, but advocates of these methods maintain that the additional time on the ground allows the horse to advance more quickly or with better manners once under saddle.

=== "Backing" or riding the young horse ===
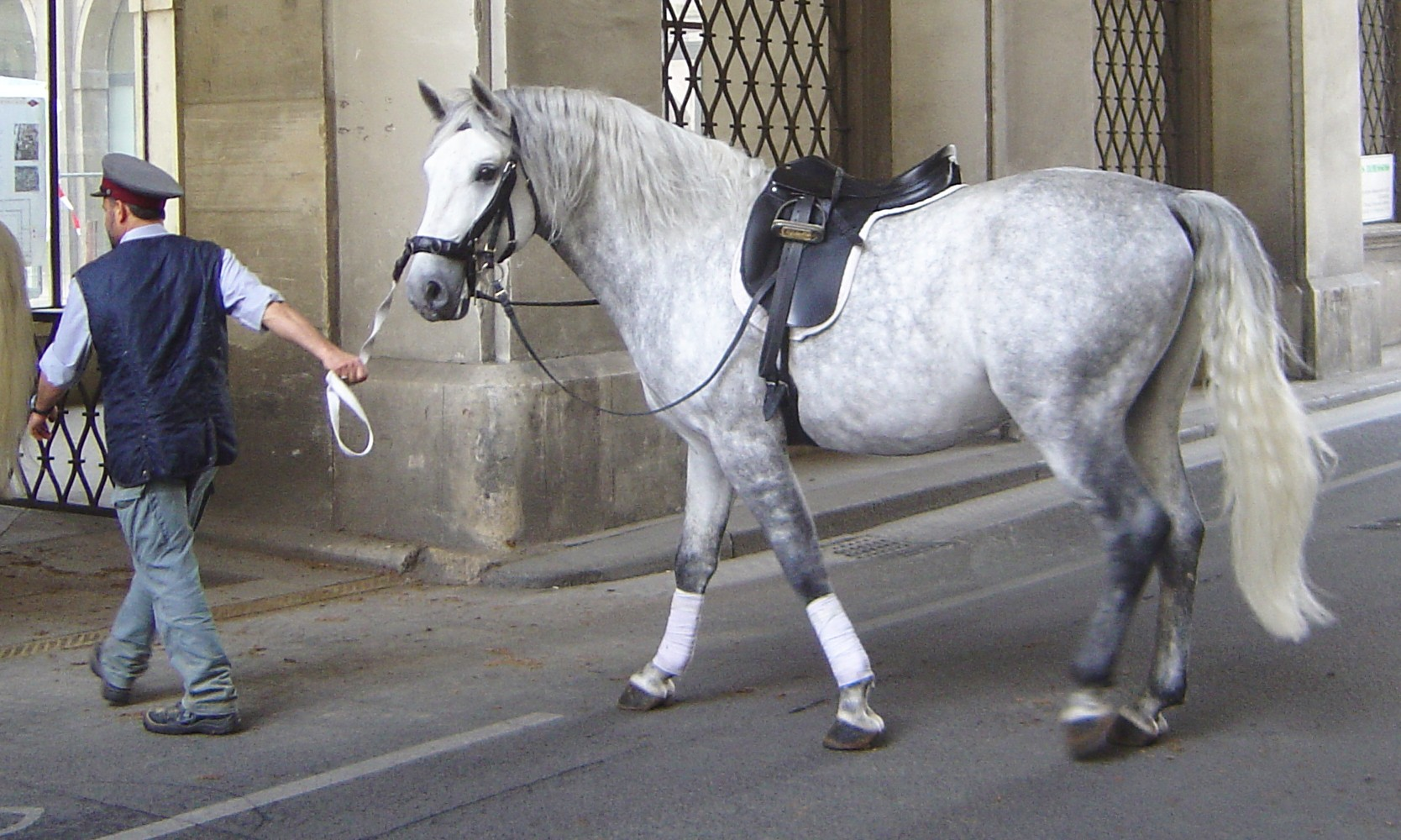
A young Lipizzan at the Spanish Riding School in training equipment, wearing saddle, bridle and longeing cavesson so that it may be longed prior to being ridden

The age that horses are first ridden, or "backed" (UK) varies considerably by breed and discipline. Many Thoroughbred race horses have small, light riders on their backs as early as the fall of their yearling year. Most stock horse breeds, such as the American Quarter Horse, are ridden at the age of two. Most horses used in harness have a cart first put behind them at age two, and even some horses not ridden until age three will be trained to pull a light cart at two, in order to learn better discipline and to help develop stronger muscles with less stress. The vast majority of horses across disciplines and throughout the world are first put under saddle at the age of three. However, some slower-maturing breeds, such as the Lipizzan, are not ridden until the age of four.

The act of getting on a horse for the first time goes by many names, including backing, breaking, mounting, and simply riding. There are many techniques for introducing the young horse to a rider or to a harness and cart for driving, but the end goal of all methods is to have the horse calmly and quietly allow a rider on its back or behind it in a cart and to respond to basic commands to go forward, change gaits and speed, stop, turn and back up.

Ideally, a young horse will have no fear of humans and view being ridden as simply one more new lesson. A properly handled young horse that had adequate ground work will seldom buck, rear, or run away when it is ridden, even for the very first time.

Horses that have never been taught to be ridden can learn at any age, though it may take somewhat longer to teach an older horse. An older horse that is used to humans but has no prior bad habits is easier to put under saddle than is a completely feral horse caught "wild" off the open range as an adult. However, an adult feral horse may be easier to train than a domesticated animal that has previously learned to treat humans with disrespect.

== Training for a specific discipline ==
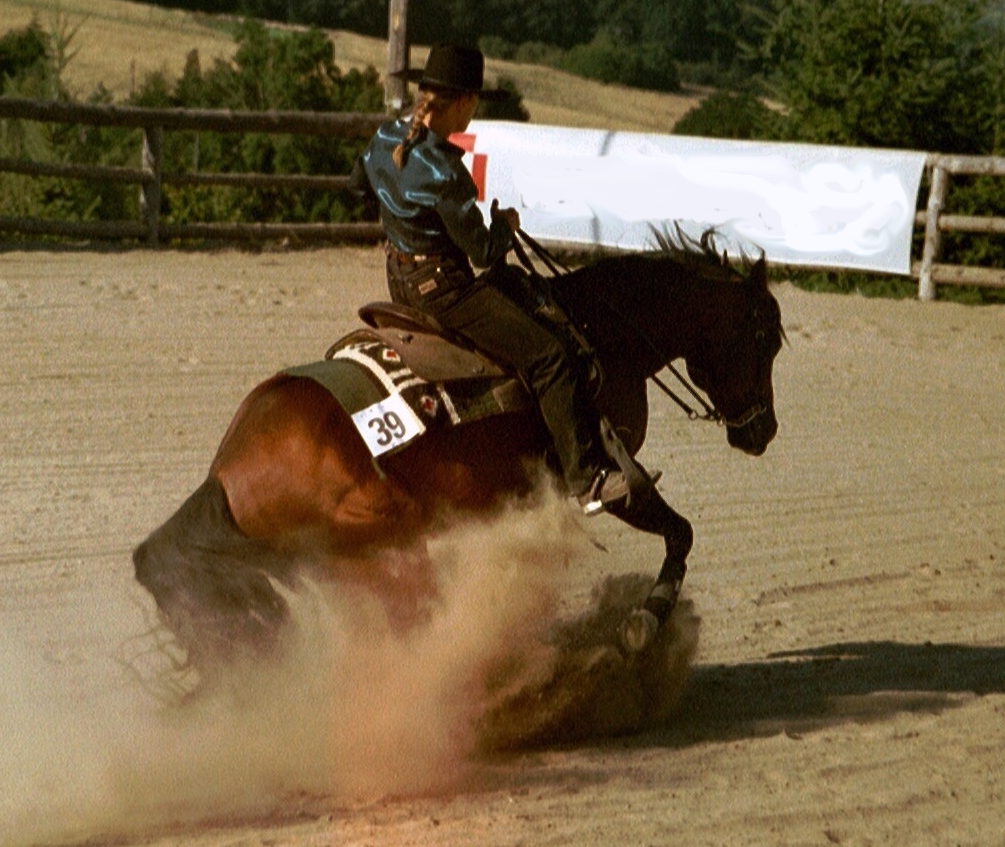
Discipline-specific training can take years to perfect

There are many horse training philosophies and techniques and details are far too extensive to describe in a single article. Also, horses have different conformation, athletic potential, temperaments and personalities, all of which may influence what techniques should be used to reap the best results. For further information on horse training and specific disciplines, see the Bibliography and the articles below, which cover many of the concepts and different schools of thought on training and handling horses. The websites of The Horse Trust and the Equine Behaviour and Training Association also provide uptodate information on evidence-based approaches. US Equestrian also offers more information concerning international and national disciplines.

== Retraining for second careers ==
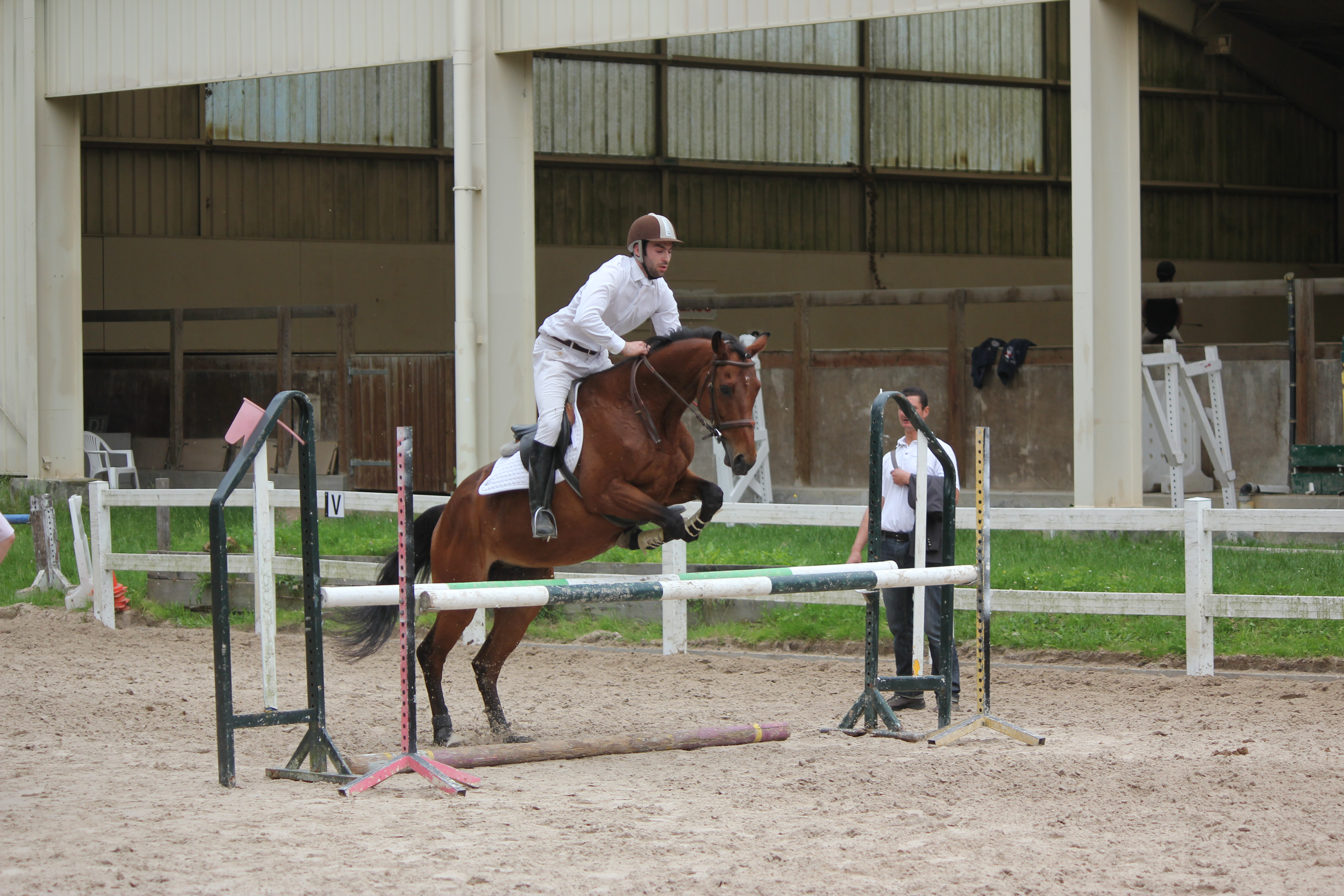
Former racehorse retraining for show jumping

Horses that are no longer suitable for the activity that they were trained for can either be retrained for less demanding activities or sent to slaughter. The notion of retraining horses has evolved over time. As horses have come to be viewed more like pets in many Western countries, there has been a growing effort to find alternatives to slaughter.

The main cause of retirement among racehorses is tendon injuries caused by locomotor asymmetry due to joint conditions or those resulting from training and racing on the track. Horses retired from racing form an important constituent of equestrian centers' stables. In some countries, they were once almost systematically resold for horsemeat, but this practice is declining, particularly in France where horse butchers are increasingly rare. However, the very high number of racehorse births is necessarily mirrored by a high number of retirements.

Most retired racehorses are sold as leisure horses, but can be difficult to retrain, especially for amateurs. It is often necessary to obtain the services of a professional trainer familiar with the challenges.

== See also ==
- Horse behavior
- Natural horsemanship
- Dressage
- Spanish Riding School
- Animal training
- Category:Horse training
