= Horse behavior =

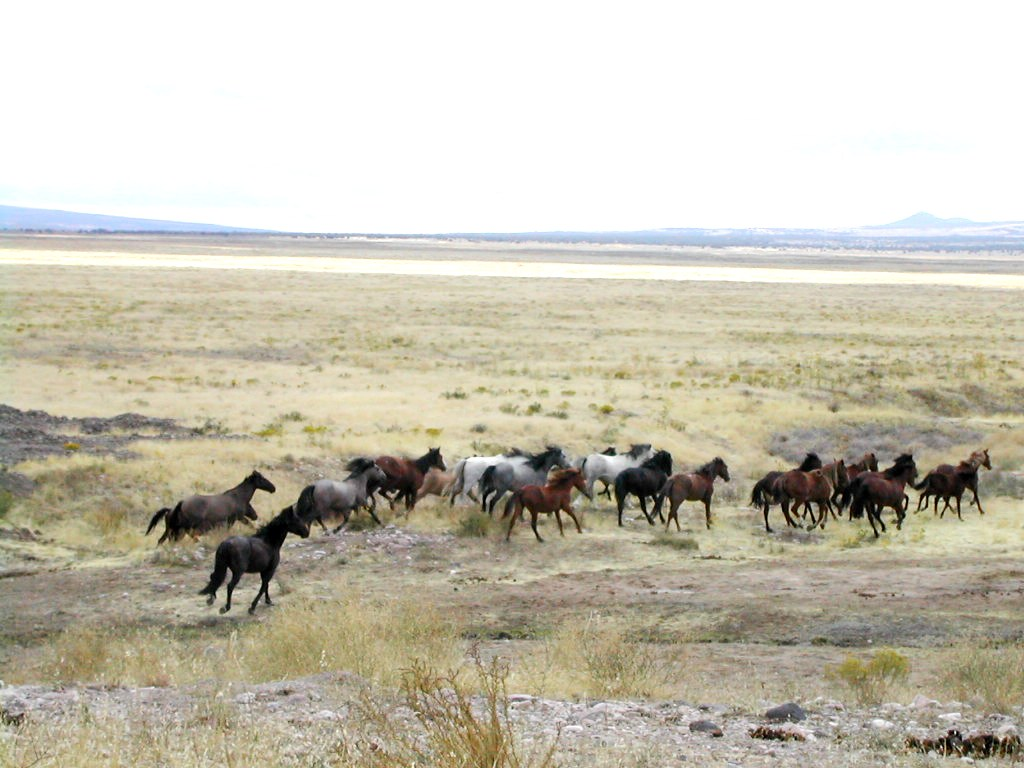
Free-roaming mustangs (Utah, 2005)

Horse behavior is best understood from the view that horses are prey animals with a well-developed fight-or-flight response. Their first reaction to a threat is often to flee, although sometimes they stand their ground and defend themselves or their offspring in cases where flight is untenable, such as when a foal would be threatened.

Nonetheless, because of their physiology horses are also suited to a number of work and entertainment-related tasks. Humans domesticated horses thousands of years ago, and they have been used by humans ever since. Through selective breeding, some breeds of horses have been bred to be quite docile, particularly certain large draft horses. On the other hand, most light horse riding breeds were developed for speed, agility, alertness, and endurance; building on natural qualities that extended from their wild ancestors.

Horses' instincts can be used to human advantage to create a bond between human and horse. These techniques vary, but are part of the art of horse training.

== The "fight-or-flight" response ==
Horses evolved from small mammals whose survival depended on their ability to flee from predators (for example: wolves, big cats, bears). This survival mechanism still exists in the modern domestic horse. Humans have removed many predators from the life of the domestic horse; however, its first instinct when frightened is to escape. If running is not possible, the horse resorts to biting, kicking, striking or rearing to protect itself. Many of the horse's natural behavior patterns, such as herd-formation and social facilitation of activities, are directly related to their being a prey species.

The fight-or-flight response involves nervous impulses which result in hormone secretions into the bloodstream. When a horse reacts to a threat, it may initially "freeze" in preparation to take flight. The fight-or-flight reaction begins in the amygdala, which triggers a neural response in the hypothalamus. The initial reaction is followed by activation of the pituitary gland and secretion of the hormone ACTH. The adrenal gland is activated almost simultaneously and releases the neurotransmitters epinephrine (adrenaline) and norepinephrine (noradrenaline). The release of chemical messengers results in the production of the hormone cortisol, which increases blood pressure and blood sugar, and suppresses the immune system. Catecholamine hormones, such as epinephrine and norepinephrine, facilitate immediate physical reactions associated with a preparation for violent muscular action. The result is a rapid rise in blood pressure, resulting in an increased supply of oxygen and glucose for energy to the brain and skeletal muscles, the most vital organs the horse needs when fleeing from a perceived threat. However, the increased supply of oxygen and glucose to these areas is at the expense of "non-essential" flight organs, such as the skin and abdominal organs.

Once the horse has removed itself from immediate danger, the body is returned to more "normal" conditions via the parasympathetic nervous system. This is triggered by the release of endorphins into the brain, and it effectively reverses the effects of noradrenaline – metabolic rate, blood pressure and heart rate all decrease and the increased oxygen and glucose being supplied to the muscles and brain are returned to normal. This is also known as the "rest and digest" state.

== As herd animals ==
Horses are highly social herd animals that prefer to live in a group.

An older theory of hierarchy in herd of horses is the "linear dominance hierarchy". Newer research shows that there is no "pecking order" in horse herds. Free ranging, wild horses are mostly communicating via positive reinforcement and less via punishment.

Horses are able to form companionship attachments not only to their own species, but with other animals as well, most notably humans. In fact, many domesticated horses will become anxious, flighty, and hard to manage if they are isolated. Horses kept in near-complete isolation, particularly in a closed stable where they cannot see other animals, may require a stable companion such as a cat, goat, or even a small pony or donkey, to provide company and reduce stress.

When anxiety over separation occurs while a horse is being handled by a human, the horse is described as "herd-bound". However, through proper training, horses learn to be comfortable away from other horses, often because they learn to trust a human handler. Horses are able to trust a human handler. Since it is not possible to form interspecies herds, humans cannot be part of a horse herd hierarchy and therefore can never take the place of "lead-mares" or "lead-stallions".

=== Social organization in the wild ===
Feral and wild horse "herds" are usually made up of several separate, small "bands" which share a territory. Size may range from two to 25 individuals, mostly mares and their offspring, with one to five stallions.

Bands are defined as a harem model. Each band is led by a dominant mare (sometimes called the "lead mare" or the "boss mare"). The composition of bands changes as young animals are driven out of their natal band and join other bands, or as stallions challenge each other for dominance.

In bands, there is usually a single "herd" or "lead" stallion, though occasionally a few less-dominant males may remain on the fringes of the group. The reproductive success of the lead stallion is determined in part by his ability to prevent other males from mating with the mares of his harem. The stallion also exercises protective behavior, patrolling around the band, and taking the initiative when the band encounters a potential threat. The stability of the band is not affected by size, but tends to be more stable when there are subordinate stallions attached to the harem.

In modern reintroduced populations of Przewalski's horse, the only remaining truly wild horse, family groups are formed by one adult stallion, one to three mares, and their common offspring that stay in the family group until they are no longer dependent, usually at two or three years old.

=== Hierarchical structure ===
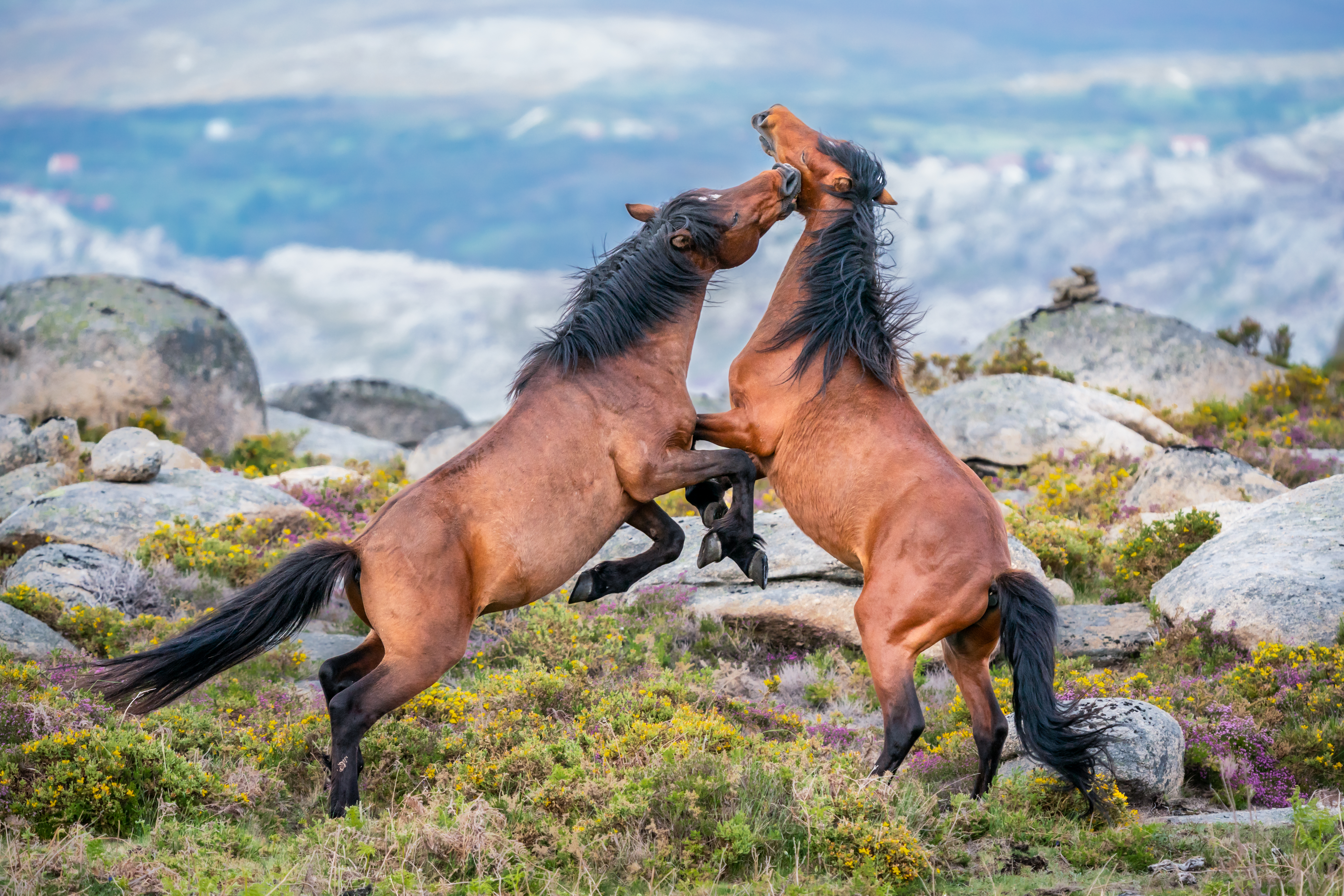
Fights for dominance are normally brief; sometimes, displays which do not involve physical contact are sufficient to maintain the hierarchy.

Horses have evolved to live in herds. As with many animals that live in large groups, establishment of a stable hierarchical system or "pecking order" is important to reduce aggression and increase group cohesion. This is often, but not always, a linear system. In non-linear hierarchies horse A may be dominant over horse B, who is dominant over horse C, yet horse C may be dominant over horse A. Dominance can depend on a variety of factors, including an individual's need for a particular resource at a given time. It can therefore be variable throughout the lifetime of the herd or individual animal. Some horses may be dominant over all resources and others may be submissive for all resources. This is not part of natural horse behavior. It is forced by humans forcing horses to live together in limited space with limited resources. So called "dominant horses" are often horses with dysfunctional social abilities - caused by human intervention in their early lives.

Once a dominance hierarchy is established, horses more often than not will travel in rank order.

Most young horses in the wild are allowed to stay with the herd until they reach sexual maturity, usually in their first or second year. Studies of wild herds have shown that the herd stallion will usually drive out both colts and fillies; this may be an instinct that prevents inbreeding. The fillies usually join another band soon afterward, and the colts driven out from several herds usually join in small "bachelor" groups until those who are able to establish dominance over an older stallion in another herd.

=== Role of the lead mare ===
Contrary to popular belief, the herd stallion is not the "ruler" of a harem of females, though he usually engages in herding and protective behavior. Rather, the horse that tends to lead a wild or feral herd is most commonly a dominant mare. The mare "guides the herd to food and water, controls the daily routine and movement of the herd, and ensures the general wellbeing of the herd."

A recent supplemental theory posits that there is "distributed leadership", and no single individual is a universal herd leader. A 2014 study of horses in Italy, described as "feral" by the researcher, observed that some herd movements may be initiated by any individual, although higher-ranked members are followed more often by other herd members.

=== Role of the stallion ===
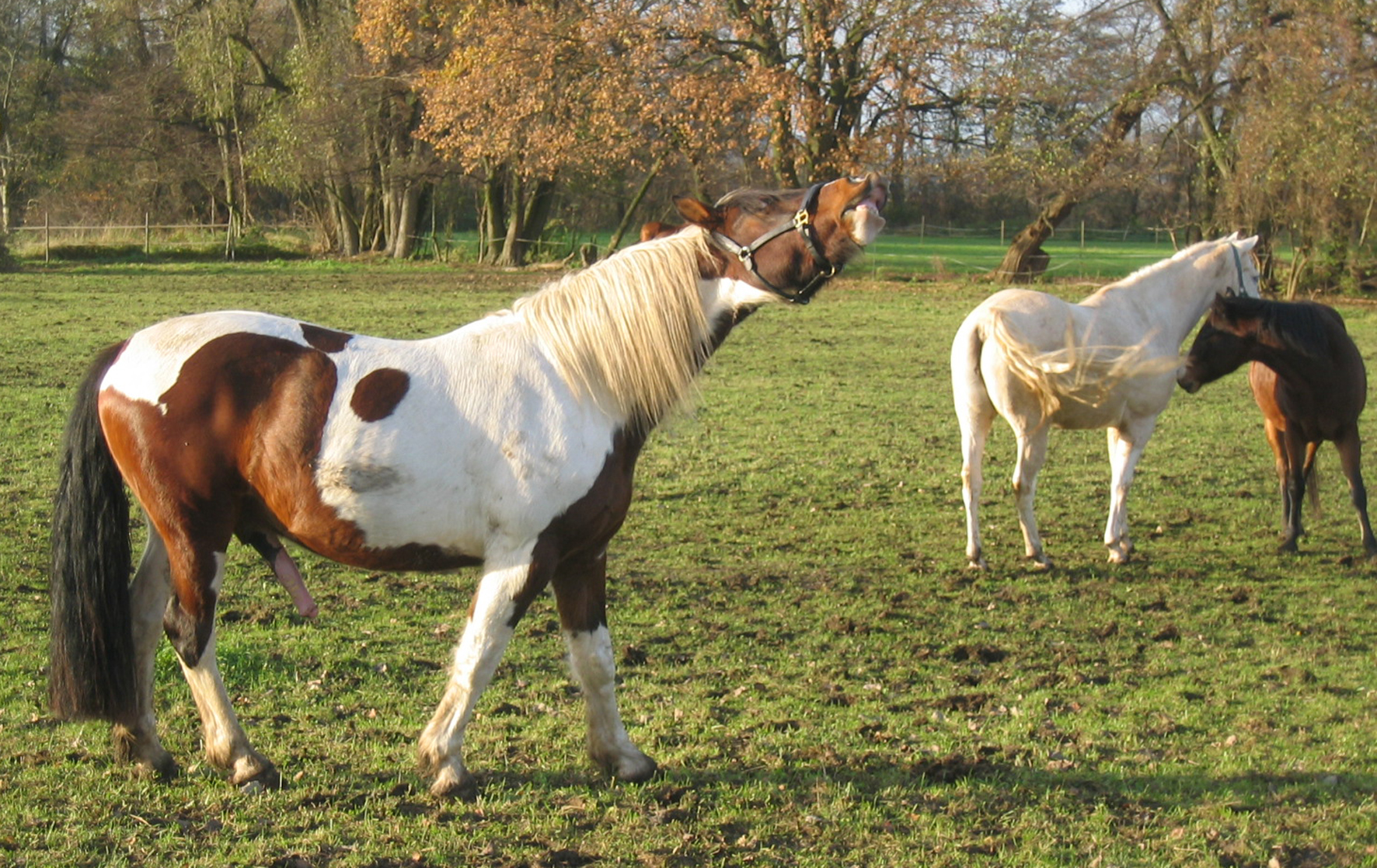
A stallion (foreground) exhibiting the flehmen response

Stallions tend to stay on the periphery of the herd where they fight off both predators and other males. When the herd travels, the stallion is usually at the rear and apparently drives straggling herd members forward, keeping the herd together. Mares and lower-ranked males do not usually engage in this herding behavior. During the mating season, stallions tend to act more aggressively to keep the mares within the herd, however, most of the time, the stallion is relaxed and spends much of his time "guarding" the herd by scent-marking manure piles and urination spots to communicate his dominance as herd stallion.

=== Ratio of stallions and mares ===
Domesticated stallions, with human management, often mate with ("cover") more mares in a year than is possible in the wild. Traditionally, thoroughbred stud farms limited stallions to breeding with between 40 and 60 mares a year. By breeding mares only at the peak of their estrous cycle, a few thoroughbred stallions have mated with over 200 mares per year. With use of artificial insemination, one stallion could potentially sire thousands of offspring annually, though in practice, economic considerations usually limit the number of foals produced.

=== Domesticated stallion behavior ===
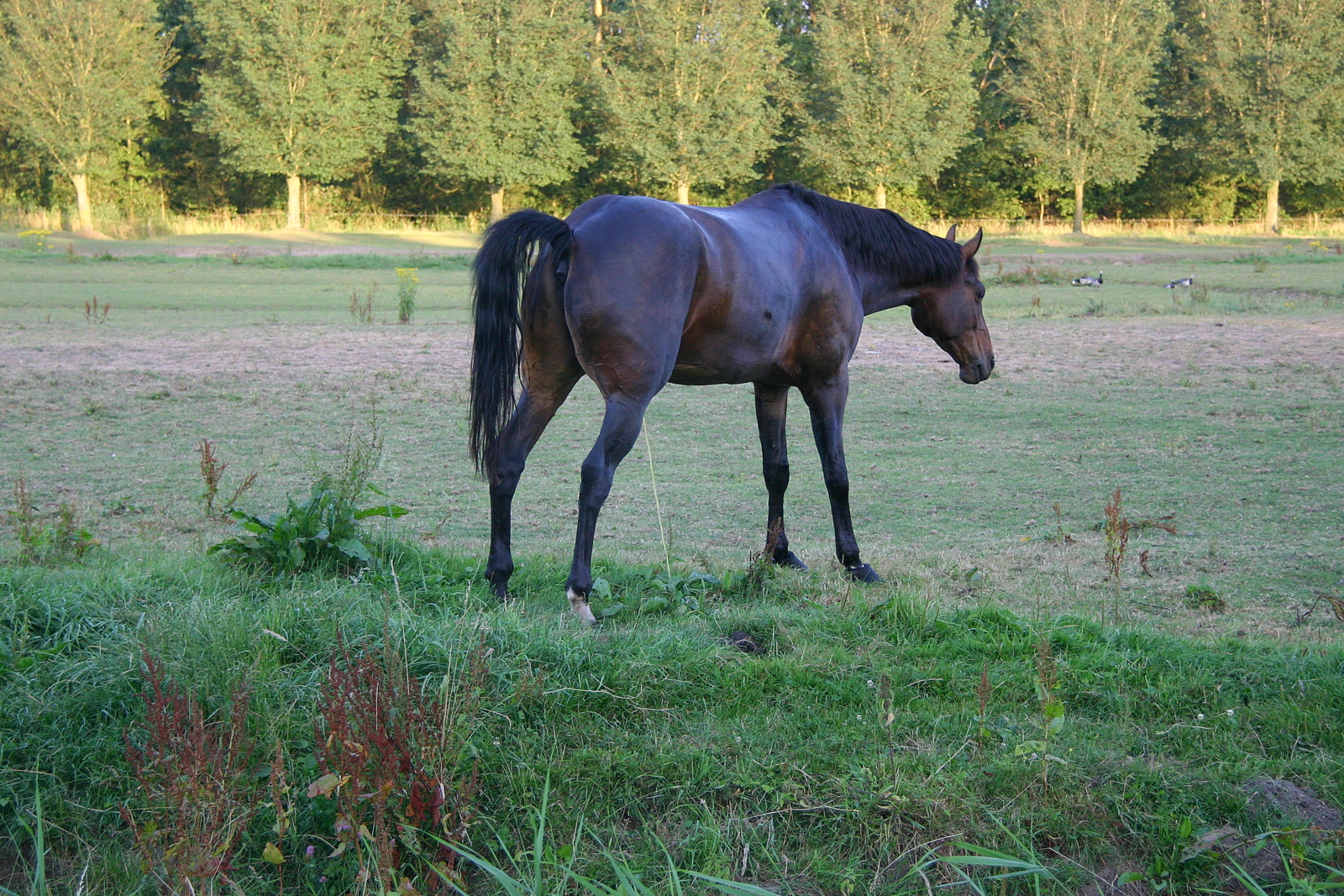
Horses urinate 3–6 times per day.

Some breeders keep horses in semi-natural conditions, with a single stallion amongst a group of mares. This is referred to as "pasture breeding." Young immature stallions are kept in a separate "bachelor herd." While this has advantages of less intensive labor for human caretakers, and full-time turnout (living in pasture) may be psychologically healthy for the horses, pasture breeding presents a risk of injury to valuable breeding stock, both stallions and mares, particularly when unfamiliar animals are added to the herd. It also raises questions of when or if a mare is bred, and may also raise questions as to parentage of foals. Therefore, keeping stallions in a natural herd is not common, especially on breeding farms mating multiple stallions to mares from other herds. Natural herds are more often kept on farms with closed herds, i.e. only one or a few stallions with a stable mare herd and few, if any, mares from other herds.

Mature, domesticated stallions are commonly kept by themselves in a stable or small paddock. When stallions are stabled in a manner that allows visual and tactile communication, they will often challenge each another and sometimes attempt to fight. Therefore, stallions are often kept isolated from each other to reduce the risk of injury and disruption to the rest of the stable. If stallions are provided with access to paddocks, there is often a corridor between the paddocks so the stallions cannot touch each other. In some cases, stallions are released for exercise at different times of the day to ensure they do not see or hear each another.

To avoid stable vices associated with isolation, some stallions are provided with a non-horse companion, such as a castrated donkey or a goat (the Godolphin Arabian was particularly fond of a barn cat). While many domesticated stallions become too aggressive to tolerate the close presence of any other male horse without fighting, some tolerate a gelding as a companion, particularly one that has a very calm temperament. One example of this was the racehorse Seabiscuit, who lived with a gelding companion named "Pumpkin". Other stallions may tolerate the close presence of an immature and less dominant stallion.

Stallions and mares often compete together at horse shows and in horse races, however, stallions generally must be kept away from close contact with mares, both to avoid unintentional or unplanned matings, and away from other stallions to minimize fighting for dominance. When horses are lined up for award presentations at shows, handlers keep stallions at least one horse length from any other animal. Stallions can be taught to ignore mares or other stallions that are in close proximity while they are working.

Stallions live peacefully in bachelor herds in the wild and in natural management settings. For example, the stallions in the New Forest (U.K.) live in bachelor herds on their winter grazing pastures. When managed as domesticated animals, some farms assert that carefully managed social contact benefits stallions. Well-tempered stallions intended to be kept together for a long period may be stabled in closer proximity, though this method of stabling is generally used only by experienced stable managers. An example of this is the stallions of the Spanish Riding School, which travel, train and are stabled in close proximity. In these settings, more dominant animals are kept apart by stabling a young or less dominant stallion in the stall between them.

=== Dominance in domesticated herds ===
Because domestication of the horse usually requires stallions to be isolated from other horses, either mares or geldings may become dominant in a domestic herd. Usually dominance in these cases is a matter of age and, to some extent, temperament. It is common for older animals to be dominant, though old and weak animals may lose their rank in the herd. There are also studies suggesting that a foal will "inherit" or perhaps imprint dominance behavior from its dam, and at maturity seek to obtain the same rank in a later herd that its mother held when the horse was young.

Studies of domesticated horses indicate that horses appear to benefit from a strong female presence in the herd. Groupings of all geldings, or herds where a gelding is dominant over the rest of the herd; for example if the mares in the herd are quite young or of low status, may be more anxious as a group and less relaxed than those where a mare is dominant.

== Communication ==
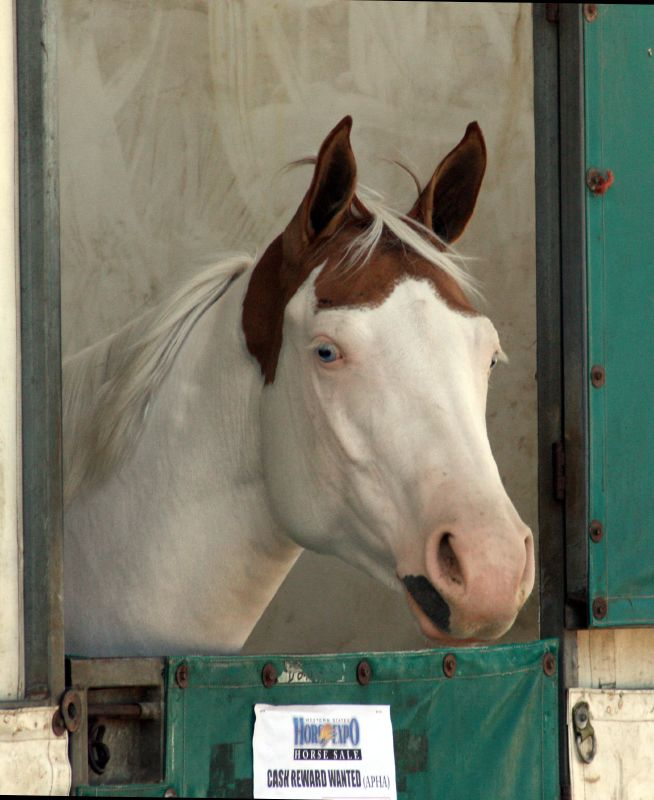
Forward ear position indicating alertness.

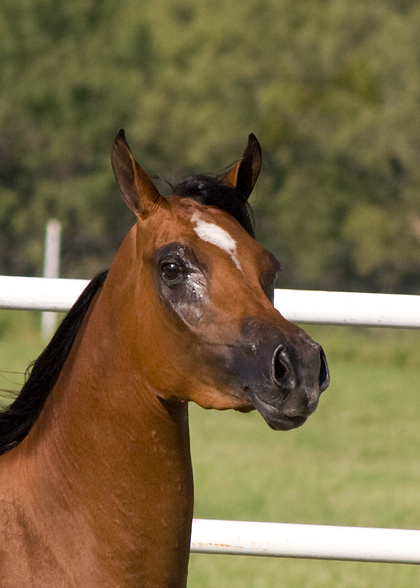
One ear forward and one ear back, usually indicating divided attention or environmental monitoring.

Horses communicate in various ways, including vocalizations such as nickering, squealing or whinnying; touch, through mutual grooming or nuzzling; smell; and body language. Horses use a combination of ear position, neck and head height, movement, and foot stomping or tail swishing to communicate. Discipline is maintained in a horse herd first through body language and gestures, then, if needed, through physical contact such as biting, kicking, nudging, or other means of forcing a misbehaving herd member to move. In most cases, the animal that successfully causes another to move is dominant, whether it uses only body language or adds physical reinforcement.

Horses can interpret the body language of other creatures, including humans, whom they view as predators. If socialized to human contact, horses usually respond to humans as a non-threatening predator. Humans do not always understand this, however, and may behave in a way, particularly if using aggressive discipline, that resembles an attacking predator and triggers the horse's fight-or-flight response. On the other hand, some humans exhibit fear of a horse, and a horse may interpret this behavior as human submission to the authority of the horse, placing the human in a subordinate role in the horse's mind. This may lead the horse to behave in a more dominant and aggressive fashion. Human handlers are more successful if they learn to properly interpret a horse's body language and temper their own responses accordingly. Some methods of horse training explicitly instruct horse handlers to behave in ways that the horse will interpret as the behavior of a trusted leader in a herd and thus more willingly comply with commands from a human handler. Other methods encourage operant conditioning to teach the horse to respond in a desired way to human body language, but also teach handlers to recognize the meaning of horse body language.

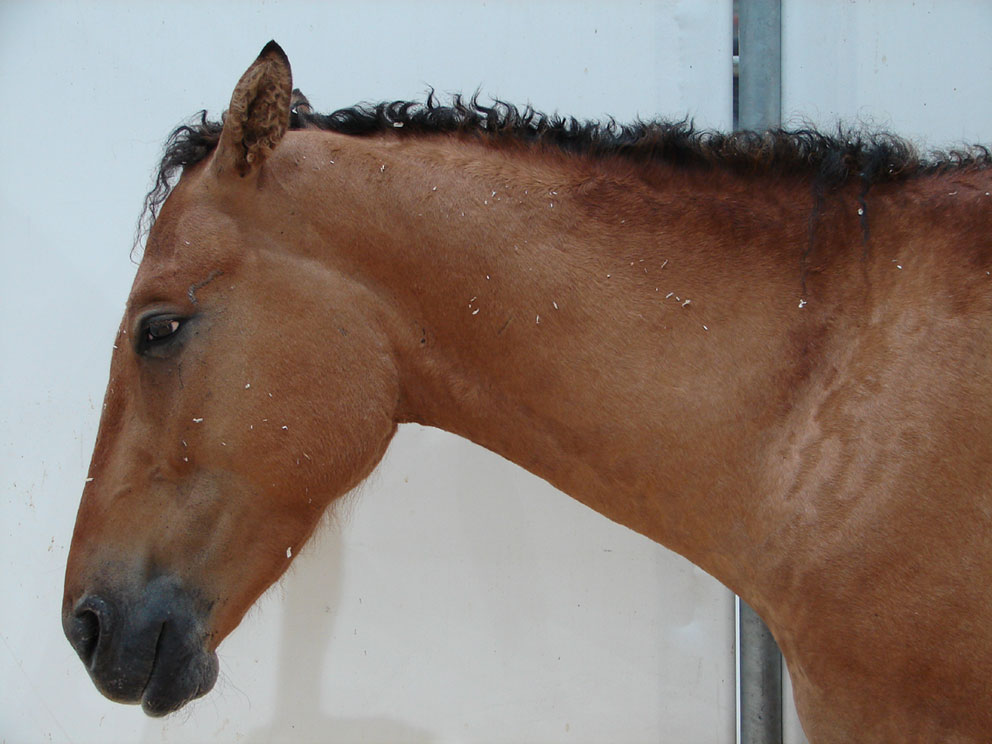
Relaxed ear position of a bored or resting horse. Lower lip is loose, also indicating relaxation. The sclera of this horse's eye shows a bit of white, but it is not rolled back in fear or anger.

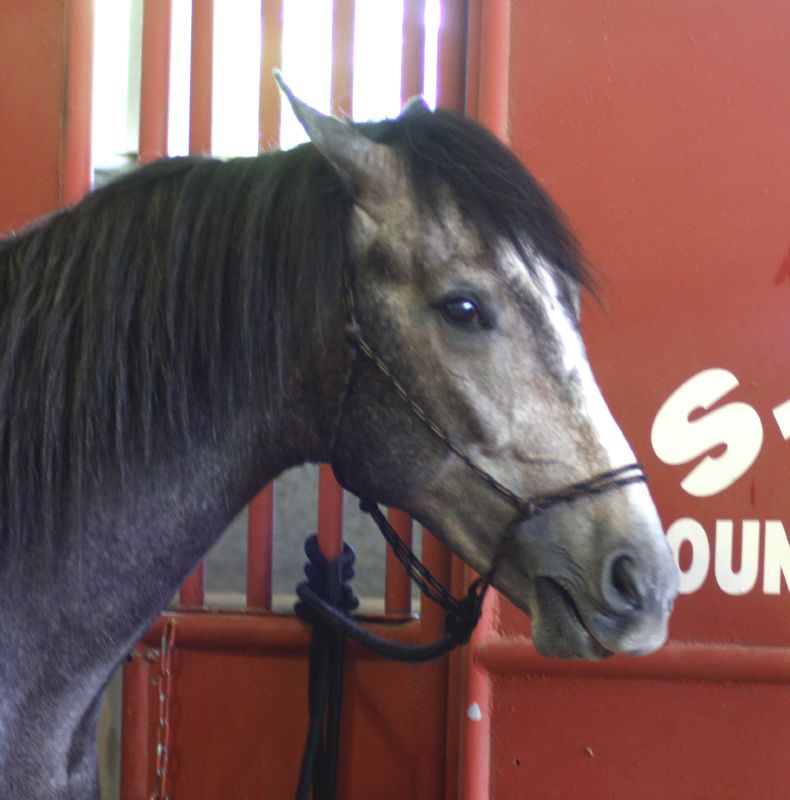
Tense, backward ear position indicating apprehension. Mouth and lips are also tense, which may indicate an increased tendency to bite.

Horses are not particularly vocal, but do have four basic vocalizations: the neigh or whinny, the nicker, the squeal and the snort. They may also make sighing, grunting or groaning noises at times.

Ear position is often one of the most obvious behaviors that humans notice when interpreting horse body language. In general, a horse will direct the pinna of an ear toward the source of input it is also looking at. Horses have a narrow range of binocular vision, and thus a horse with both ears forward is generally concentrating on something in front of it. Similarly, when a horse turns both ears forward, the degree of tension in the horse's pinna suggests if the animal is calmly attentive to its surroundings or tensely observing a potential danger. However, because horses have strong monocular vision, it is possible for a horse to position one ear forward and one ear back, indicative of similar divided visual attention. This behavior is often observed in horses while working with humans, where they need to simultaneously focus attention on both their handler and their surroundings. A horse may turn the pinna back when also seeing something coming up behind it.

Due to the nature of a horse's vision, head position may indicate where the animal is focusing attention. To focus on a distant object, a horse will raise its head. To focus on an object close by, and especially on the ground, the horse will lower its nose and carry its head in a near-vertical position. Eyes rolled to the point that the white of the eye is visible often indicates fear or anger.

Ear position, head height, and body language may change to reflect emotional status as well. For example, the clearest signal a horse sends is when both ears are flattened tightly back against the head, sometimes with eyes rolled so that the white of the eye shows, often indicative of pain or anger, frequently foreshadowing aggressive behavior that will soon follow. Sometimes ears laid back, especially when accompanied by a strongly swishing tail or stomping or pawing with the feet are signals used by the horse to express discomfort, irritation, impatience, or anxiety. However, horses with ears slightly turned back but in a loose position, may be drowsing, bored, fatigued, or simply relaxed. When a horse raises its head and neck, the animal is alert and often tense. A lowered head and neck may be a sign of relaxation, but depending on other behaviors may also indicate fatigue or illness.

Tail motion may also be a form of communication. Slight tail swishing is often a tool to dislodge biting insects or other skin irritants. However, aggressive tail-swishing may indicate either irritation, pain or anger. The tail tucked tightly against the body may indicate discomfort due to cold or, in some cases, pain. The horse may demonstrate tension or excitement by raising its tail, but also by flaring its nostrils, snorting, and intently focusing its eyes and ears on the source of concern.

The horse does not use its mouth to communicate to the degree that it uses its ears and tail, but a few mouth gestures have meaning beyond that of eating, grooming, or biting at an irritation. Bared teeth, as noted above, are an expression of anger and an imminent attempt to bite. Horses, particularly foals, sometimes indicate appeasement of a more aggressive herd member by extending their necks and clacking their teeth. Horses making a chewing motion with no food in the mouth do so as a soothing mechanism, possibly linked to a release of tension, though some horse trainers view it as an expression of submission. Horses will sometimes extend their upper lip when scratched in a particularly good spot, and if their mouth touches something at the time, their lip and teeth may move in a mutual grooming gesture. A very relaxed or sleeping horse may have a loose lower lip and chin that may extend further out than the upper lip. The curled lip flehmen response, noted above, most often is seen in stallions, but is usually a response to the smell of another horse's urine, and may be exhibited by horses of any sex. Horses also have assorted mouth motions that are a response to a bit or the rider's hands, some indicating relaxation and acceptance, others indicating tension or resistance.

== Sleep patterns ==
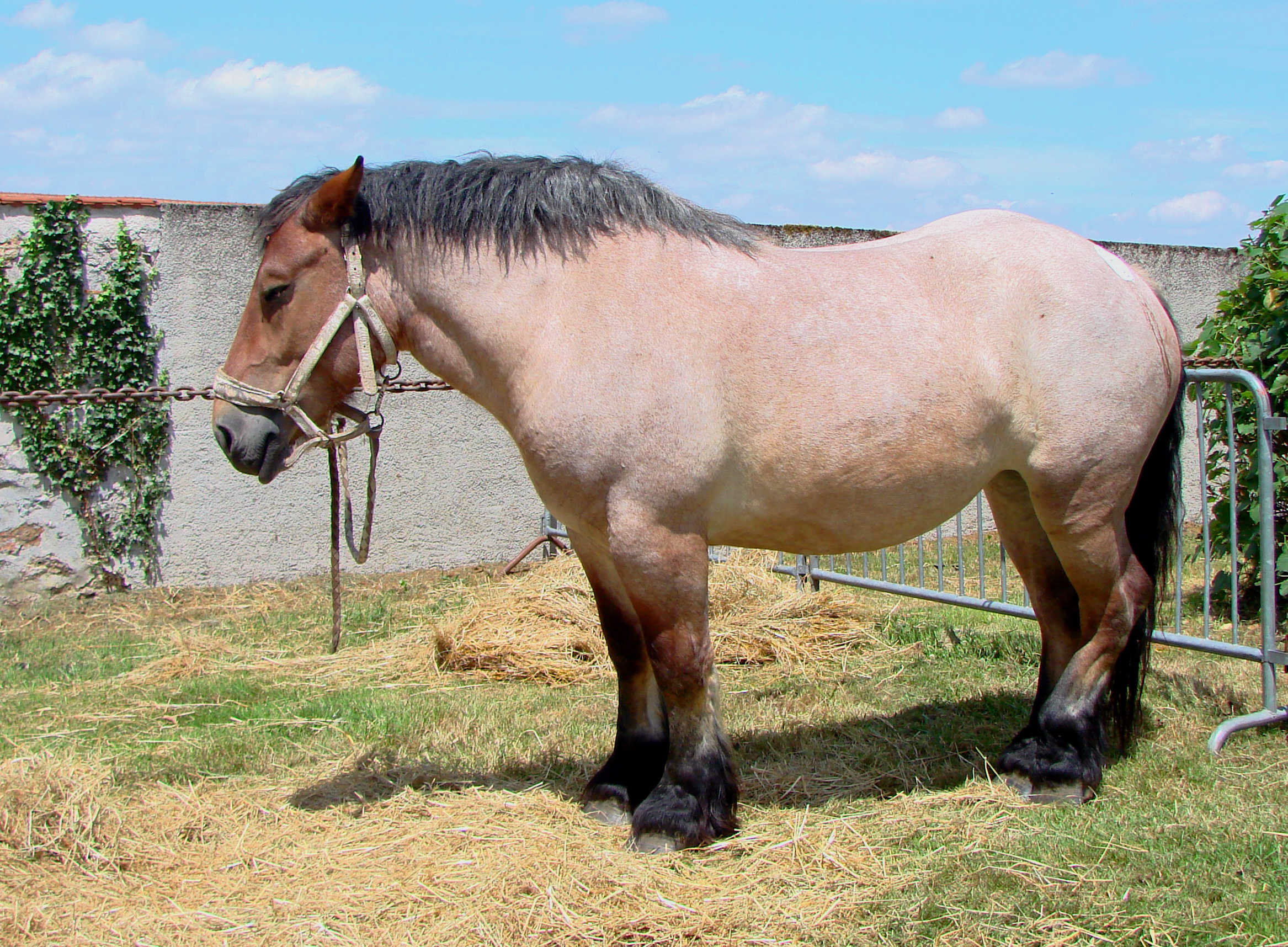
A draft horse sleeping while standing up

Horses can sleep both standing up and lying down. They can sleep while standing, an adaptation from life as a prey animal in the wild. Lying down makes an animal more vulnerable to predators. Horses are able to sleep standing up because a "stay apparatus" in their legs allows them to relax their muscles and doze without collapsing. In the front legs, their equine forelimb anatomy automatically engages the stay apparatus when their muscles relax. The horse engages the stay apparatus in the hind legs by shifting its hip position to lock the patella in place. At the stifle joint, a "hook" structure on the inside bottom end of the femur cups the patella and the medial patella ligament, preventing the leg from bending.

Horses obtain needed sleep by many short periods of rest. This is to be expected of a prey animal, that needs to be ready on a moment's notice to flee from predators. Horses may spend anywhere from four to fifteen hours a day in standing rest, and from a few minutes to several hours lying down. However, not all this time is the horse asleep; total sleep time in a day may range from several minutes to two hours. Horses require approximately two and a half hours of sleep, on average, in a 24-hour period. Most of this sleep occurs in many short intervals of about 15 minutes each. These short periods of sleep consist of five minutes of slow-wave sleep, followed by five minutes of rapid eye movement sleep (REM) and then another five minutes of slow-wave sleep.

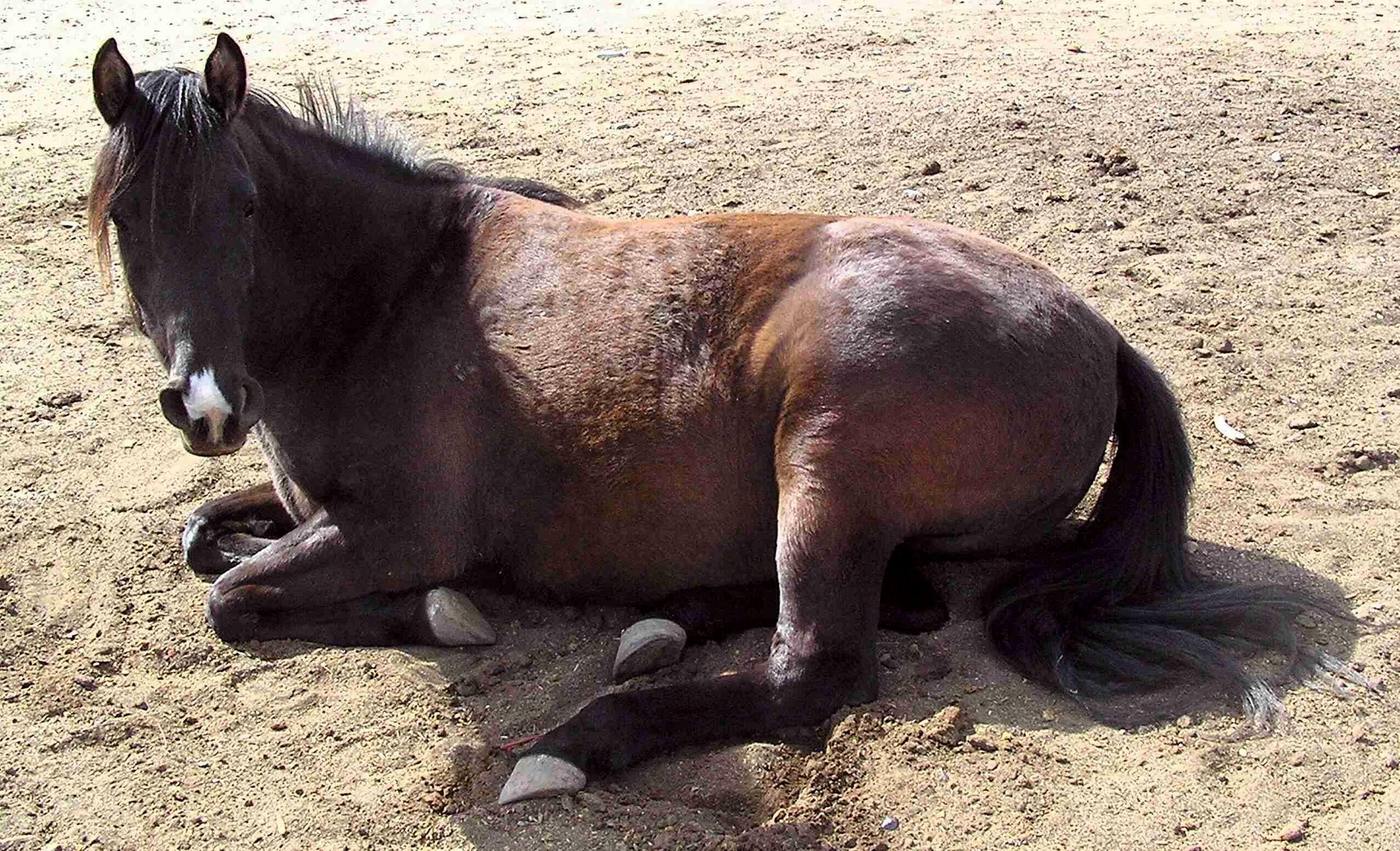
Horses need to lie down occasionally, and prefer soft ground for a nap.

Horses must lie down to reach REM sleep. They only have to lie down for an hour or two every few days to meet their minimum REM sleep requirements. However, if a horse is never allowed to lie down, after several days it will become sleep-deprived, and in rare cases may suddenly collapse as it involuntarily slips into REM sleep while still standing. This condition differs from narcolepsy, which horses may suffer from.

Horses sleep better when in groups because some animals will sleep while others stand guard to watch for predators. A horse kept entirely alone may not sleep well because its instincts are to keep a constant eye out for danger.

== Eating patterns ==
Horses have a strong grazing instinct, preferring to spend most hours of the day eating forage. Horses and other equids evolved as grazing animals, adapted to eating small amounts of the same kind of food all day long. In the wild, the horse adapted to eating prairie grasses in semi-arid regions and traveling significant distances each day in order to obtain adequate nutrition. Thus, they are "trickle eaters," meaning they have to have an almost constant supply of food to keep their digestive system working properly. Horses can become anxious or stressed if there are long periods of time between meals. When stabled, they do best when they are fed on a regular schedule; they are creatures of habit and are easily upset by changes in routine. When horses are in a herd, their behavior is hierarchical; the higher-ranked animals in the herd eat and drink first. Low-status animals, that eat last, may not get enough food, and if there is little available feed, higher-ranking horses may keep lower-ranking ones from eating at all.

== Psychological disorders ==
When confined with insufficient companionship, exercise or stimulation, horses may develop stable vices, an assortment of compulsive stereotypies considered bad habits, mostly psychological in origin, that include wood chewing, stall walking (walking in circles stressfully in the stall), wall kicking, "weaving" (rocking back and forth) and other problems. These have been linked to a number of possible causal factors, including a lack of environmental stimulation and early weaning practices. Research is ongoing to investigate the neurobiological changes involved in the performance of these behaviors.

== See also ==
- Domestication of the horse
- Equus (genus)
- Glossary of equestrian terms
- Horse
- Horse breeding
- Horse care
- Horse training
- Sacking out
- Stable vices
- Equine intelligence
