= Hobble (device) =

Device for preventing or limiting the locomotion of a human or animal

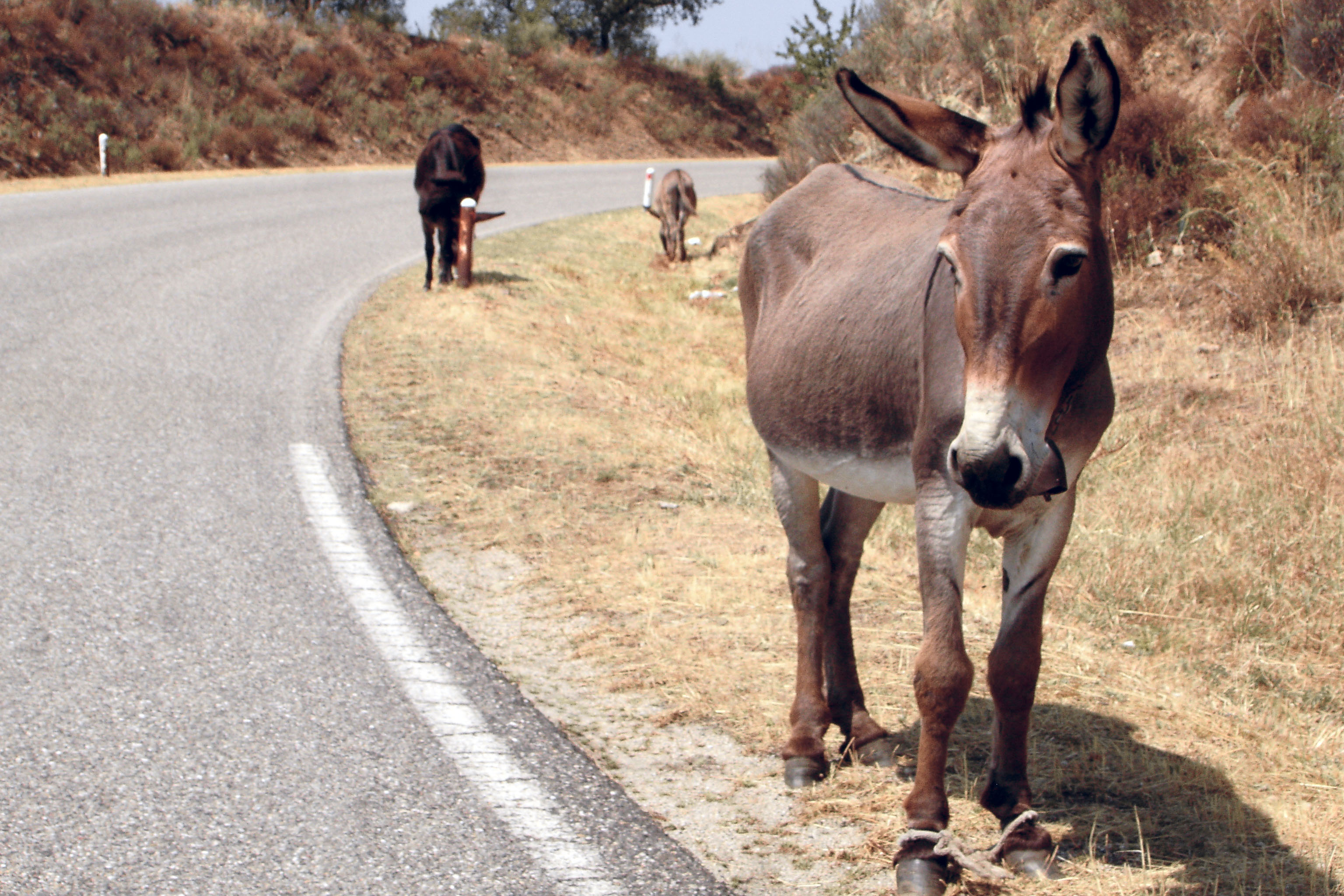
A hobbled donkey in Sardinia

A hobble (also, and perhaps earlier, hopple), or spancel, is a device which prevents or limits the locomotion of an animal, by tethering one or more legs. Although hobbles are most commonly used on horses, they are also sometimes used on other animals. On dogs, they are used especially during force-fetch training to limit the movement of a dog's front paws when training it to stay still. They are made from leather, rope, or synthetic materials such as nylon or neoprene. There are various designs for breeding, casting (causing a horse or other large animal to lie down with its legs underneath it), and mounting horses.

== Types ==
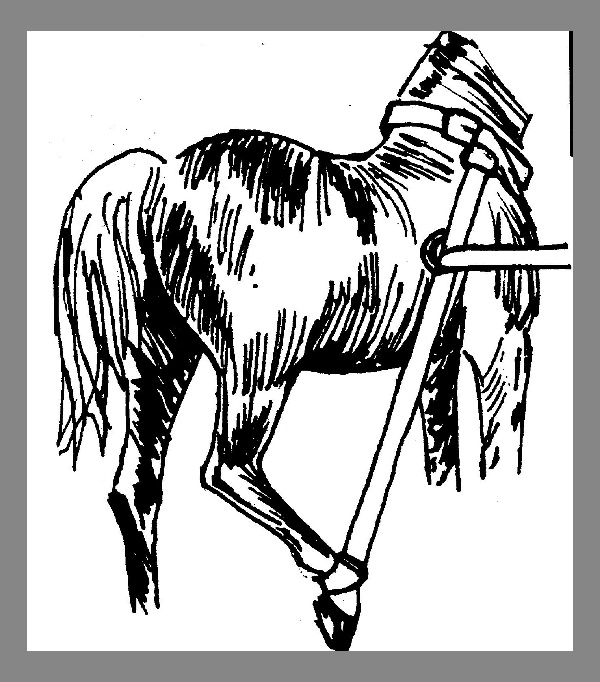
Hind leg pull up strap

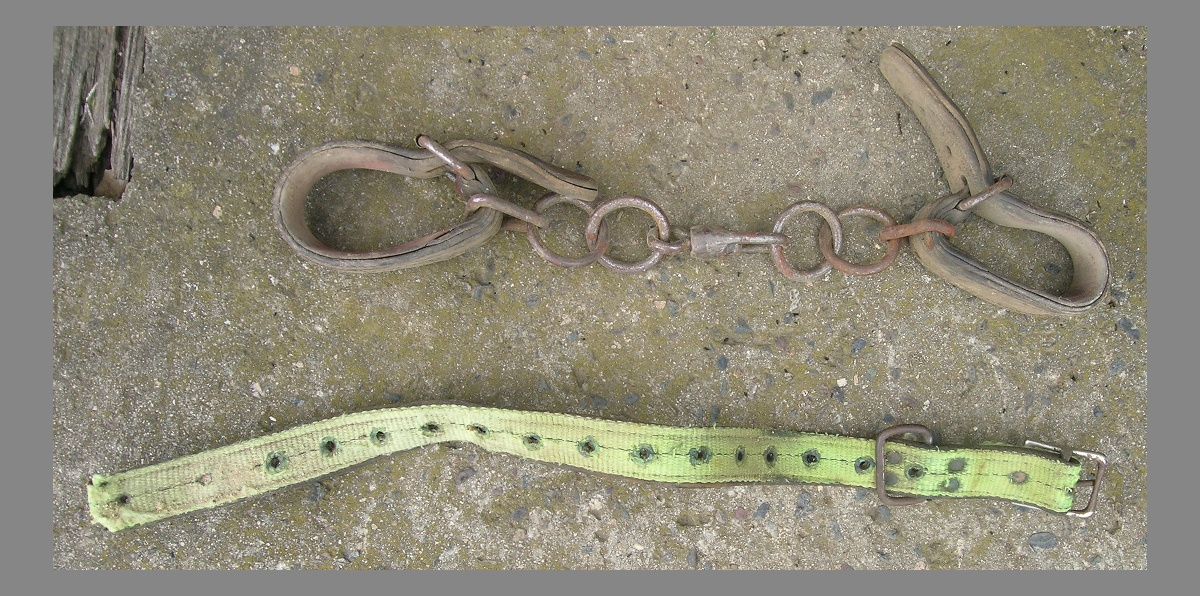
Drovers' and cattle hobbles

=== Western horse hobbles ===
"Western"-style horse hobbles are tied around the pasterns or cannon bones of the horse's front legs. They comprise three basic types:

- The vaquero or braided hobble, which is often of a quite fancy plaiting and lighter than other varieties, and is therefore only suitable for short term use.
- The figure eight hobble or Queensland Utility Strap, a common style of hobble that stockmen wear as a belt and can be used neck strap, lunch-time hobble, or tie for a “micky”. This hobble is made with three pieces of leather and two rings, plus a buckle fastening.
- The twist hobble, made of soft leather or rope, with a twist between the horse's legs.

The above patterns are unsuitable for training, as they can tighten around a leg and cause injury.

Western hobbles are normally used to secure a horse when no tie device, tree, or other object is available for that purpose; e.g., when, if traveling across open lands, a rider has to dismount for various reasons. Hobbles also allow a horse to graze and move short distances slowly, yet prevent the horse from running off too far. This is handy at night if the rider has to get some sleep; using a hobble ensures that, in the morning, they can find their horse not too far away.

Hobble training a horse is a form of sacking out and desensitizing a horse to accept restraints on its legs. This helps a horse accept pressure on its legs in case it ever becomes entangled in barbed wire or fencing. A hobble-trained horse is less likely to pull, struggle, and cut its legs in a panic, since it has been taught to give to pressure in its legs.

=== Other hobbles ===
- Breeding or service hobbles usually fasten around a mare's hocks, pass between her front legs to a neck strap. They are used to protect a stallion from kicks.
- Casting hobbles are the same as the above, but with another rope or strap attached to the other hind foot. When these straps or ropes are pulled up together, the horse will fall.
- Cattle hobbles are a strong strap with a metal keeper in the middle and a buckle at the end. They are used on the hind legs for a short period when capturing feral cattle.
- Drovers’ or grazing hobbles have a buckle on a wide double redhide or chrome leather strap and a swivel and 5 ring chain connecting them. They are placed around the pasterns.
- Hind leg pull up strap passes from a neck strap and around a hind pastern to draw up a hind foot for shoeing or treatment.
- Hopples (sometimes called hobbles) are a piece of equipment used by Standardbred pacers to help the horse maintain its pacing gait.
- Humble or one leg hobble is a strap placed around the front pastern, and then the leg is lifted and the strap is wrapped around the upper leg and then buckled, leaving the horse with three legs to stand on.
- Mounting hobbles are knee hobbles that are made with a quick release, on a lead that passes to the rider. They are used to mount fractious horses and when mounted the rider can retrieve them.

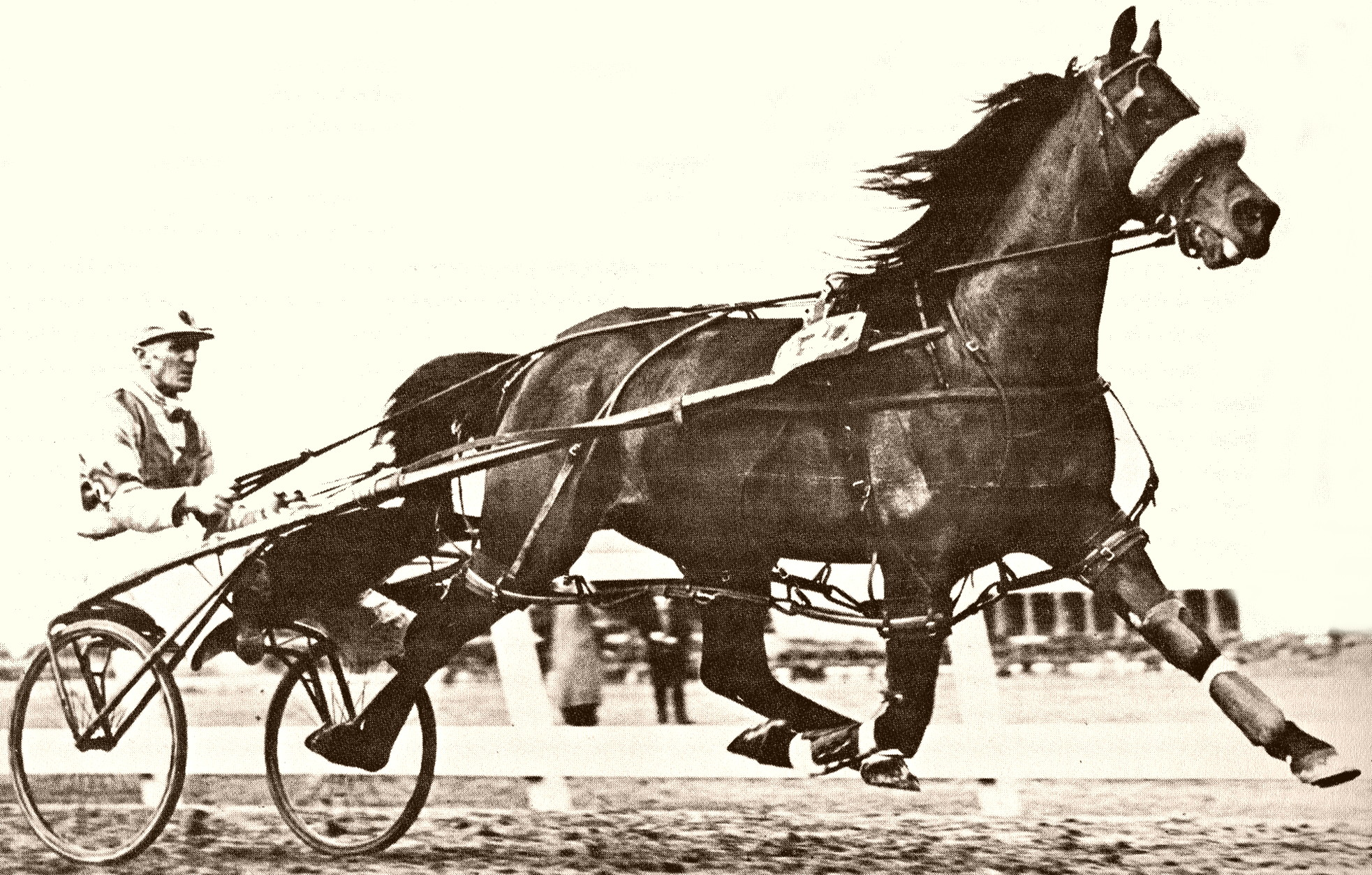
Pacing hopples

- Picket hobble is a single hobble that is placed on a front pastern and then attached to a tether chain.
- Sideline hobbles may be made in the same manner as above, but with a longer chain to hobble a front and back leg. Rope may also replace the chain. They, too, are placed around the pasterns. This pattern may be useful on a persistent jumper or a horse that has mastered the art of travelling in front leg hobbles.
- The Somali side-lining method is a traditional technique for securing horses and mules using stiff leather thongs with loops and wooden buttons, which explorers found to be safer than conventional lariats or tethers.
- Three or four leg hobbles are made in a similar pattern to the above and hobble three or four legs. Used for securing legs for operations, etc.
- In birds, hobbles can be used to treat the condition spraddle leg, which causes one or both of a bird's legs to splay sideways. The bird's hock is padded with wool or cohesive bandages, and the hobble is attached. The leg(s) will usually be healed within days.

== History ==
hieroglyph	meaning
T	hobble rope (a sound in the range of [tʲ] to [tʃ])
V20	cattle hobble, or yoke (Egyptian numeral for 10)

Hobbles date at least as far back as Ancient Egypt. Two Egyptian hieroglyphs are believed to depict hobbles.

A hobble is illustrated on a silver vase excavated from a 4th century B.C. tomb at Chertomlyk in modern day Ukraine.

The Persians were also known for their custom of hobbling. In Anabasis, Xenophon claims "a Persian army is good for nothing at night. Their horses are haltered, and, as a rule, hobbled as well to prevent their escaping as they might if loose."

== See also ==
- Hobble skirt
- Legcuffs
