= Spraddle leg =

Medical condition in birds

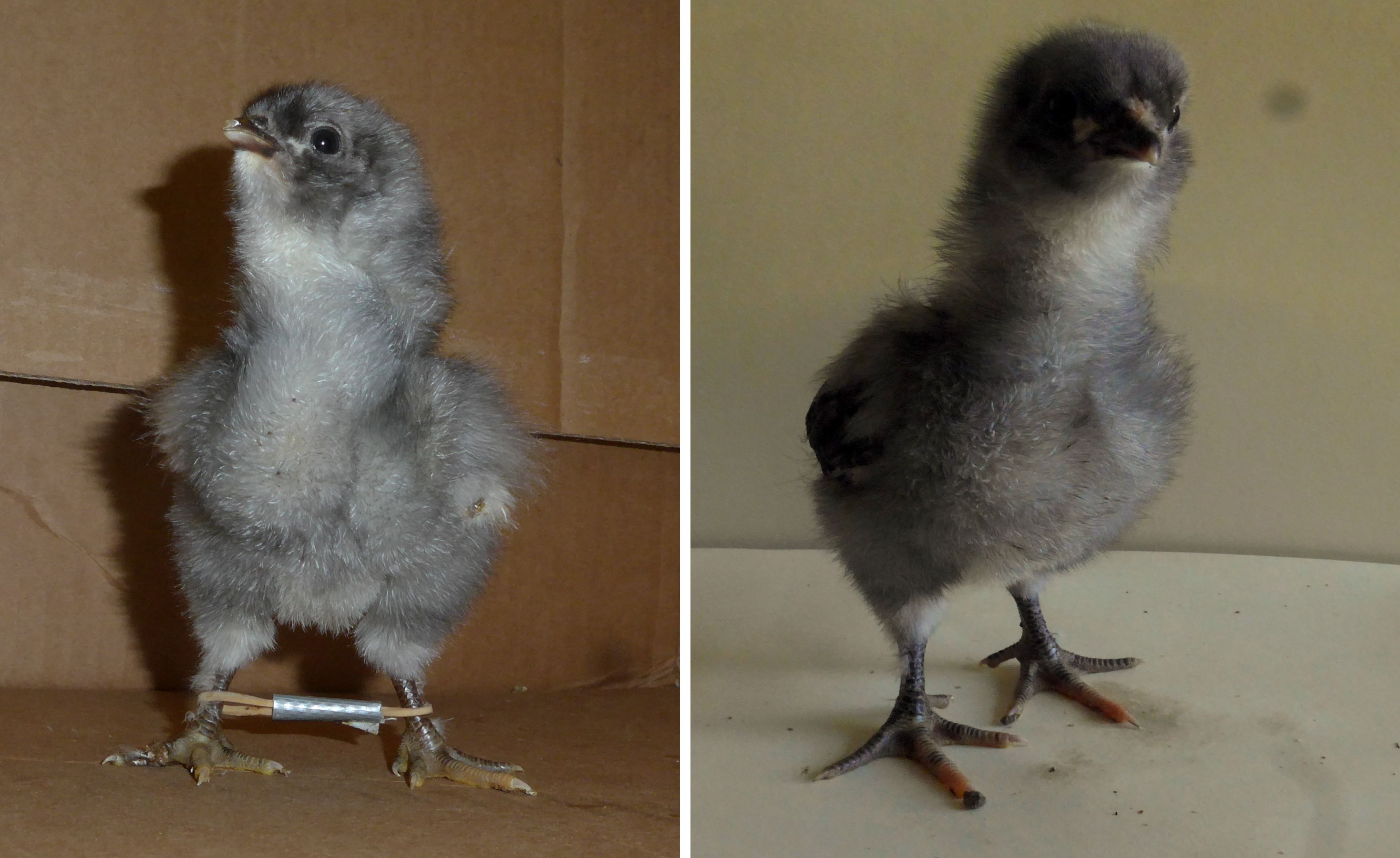
On the left, a chick with spraddle legs with elastic shackles. On right, the chick five days later.

Spraddle leg, also called splayed leg or perosis, is a condition in birds (especially poultry) in which the legs of newly hatched chicks are splayed laterally, meaning that they are unable to bear weight. Visible shortly after hatching, many different causes have been attributed to spraddle leg, though improper flooring is believed to be a major contribution. The condition can be traced using padded hobbles.

Spraddle leg occurs in several bird species, from budgerigars to bustards. It is also known to occur in piglets.

== Symptoms ==
Spraddle leg causes one or both legs to splay outwards (hence the alternative name "splayed leg"), rather than straight down. This positioning leaves a bird unable to stand, perch, or jump.

The disability can be permanent if not treated in time, and can even be fatal. A bird with permanent spraddle leg cannot walk. Poultry in such a condition is thus usually culled. Companion birds, such as parrots, may be kept alive, with the disibility being accommodated; for example, the bird may be put in a padded or carpeted cage to keep it comfortable.

== Morbidity ==
Spraddle leg occurs in a wide variety of birds. Parrots (including lovebirds, Quaker parrots, and budgerigars), gallinaceous birds (chickens and turkeys), kestrels, and the bustard family are all known to develop spraddle leg. Among the bustards, red-crested korhaans are especially susceptible to the condition, with one study finding about a quarter of all surveyed chicks had spraddle leg.

The condition affects newly hatched chicks. In turkeys, it is rare for the condition to appear in individuals older than thirty weeks.

== Causes ==
Chickens in a crowded cage with a bare wire floor. In chicks, such conditions could lead to the development of spraddle leg.

The most common cause of spraddle leg is a bone fracture that heals the wrong way. Such fractures often occur from slipping while walking. A floor that is too slippery, not covered adequately, covered in an insufficient substrate (such as paper, plastic, or pine shavings), or a wire cage floor can lead to the condition. Proper substrate would be straw or sterilized feed sacks. The bone can also be fractured if the chick is crushed under the weight of its parents or siblings.

Spraddle leg can also be a symptom of malnutrition, specifically a lack of calcium and Vitamin D. Spraddle leg is a symptom of cockatiel paralysis syndrome, itself caused by deficiency of selenium. Too much phosphorus in the diet may also be a cause, and the feeding of bonemeal, high in this element, may be the source. Improperly mixed formulas for baby birds are a frequent source of vitamin imbalances.

Spraddle leg is sometimes caused by poor incubation. During the first week of incubation, if the temperature is too low, there is a greater chance of spraddle leg occurring when the egg hatches.

Some alleged causes have been debunked. In California in the 1980s, when chloramine replaced chlorine in some water treatment facilities, there was an uptick in spraddle leg reports. However, a study on cockatiels found no evidence that chloramine causes spraddle leg.

== Treatment ==
Management focuses on the use of supports, such as hobbles or shackles, to bring the legs back towards the midline. While using such supports, the area around the hock should be padded. Wool and cohesive bandages such as VetRap are appropriate materials for padding the hocks. The condition can also be treated with "Boysdon Pads", a pair of hourglass-shaped pads that let the legs extend downwards while supporting the chick's weight. These pads can be made with foam, or from menstrual pads.

While being rehabilitated, the chick should be isolated from other birds until it is healed. Sometimes the chick will be kept in a bowl or cup, which forces it to keep its legs under its body. The chick should be kept away from water during this time, as it may drown.

In chickens and turkeys, the hobbling typically yields results in two to three days. If the condition does not improve, the bird may be culled.

== Comorbidity ==
Chicken with straight toes. Spraddle foot often coincides with crooked toes, which would bend sideways.

Chicks with spraddle leg very often have crooked toes, which bend to the side. This condition is not as dangerous, and like spraddle leg, can be treated with bracing.

Neurological problems, such as cerebellar hypoplasia, can cause symptoms which resemble spraddle leg, such as an inability to walk. As the cause of such an issue is in fact neurological, typical spraddle leg treatments, such as hobbling the legs, will not work.
