= Splay (plastics) =

Splay is a term used in the manufacture of injection molded plastics to refer to off-colored streaking along the surface of a molded part. A cosmetic defect, it is often silvery in color and is sometimes called 'silver streak'. The most common cause of splay is moisture, which is caught in the resin inside the injection molding machine during the heating process. The moisture turns to steam when heated in the barrel of the machine, and becomes tiny gas bubbles that streak across the plastic as injection occurs. This causes the silvery pattern, or streaks, to appear on the surface of the plastic.

Splay can be avoided by keeping moisture out of plastics and injection molding machines. Non-hygroscopic plastics that do not absorb moisture are less likely to suffer from splay. Mold leaks, improper drying of materials, incorrect material throughput, and non-functional dryers are other causes of moisture-related splay.

Other causes of splay are sheer and heat.
