= Legcuffs =

Physical restraints used on the ankles

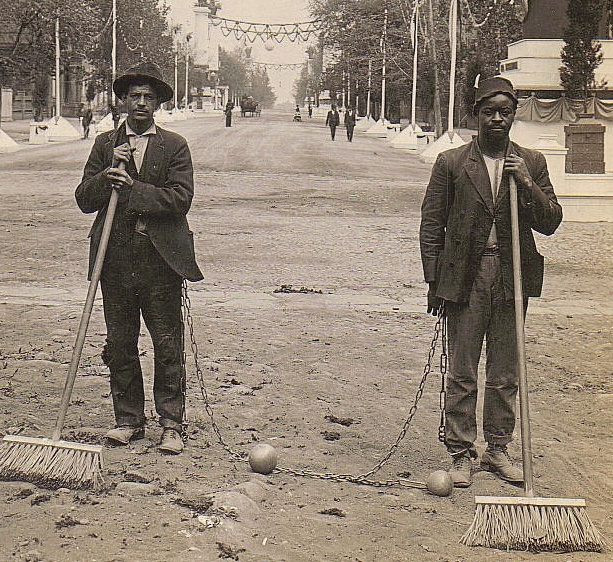
Chain gang street sweepers, 1909

Legcuffs are physical restraints used on the ankles of a person to allow walking only with a restricted stride and to prevent running and effective physical resistance. Frequently used alternative terms are leg cuffs, (leg/ankle) shackles, footcuffs, fetters or leg irons. The term "fetter" shares a root with the word "foot".

Shackles are typically used on prisoners and slaves. Leg shackles also are used for chain gangs to keep them together.

Metaphorically, a fetter may be anything that restricts or restrains in any way, hence the word "unfettered".

== History ==
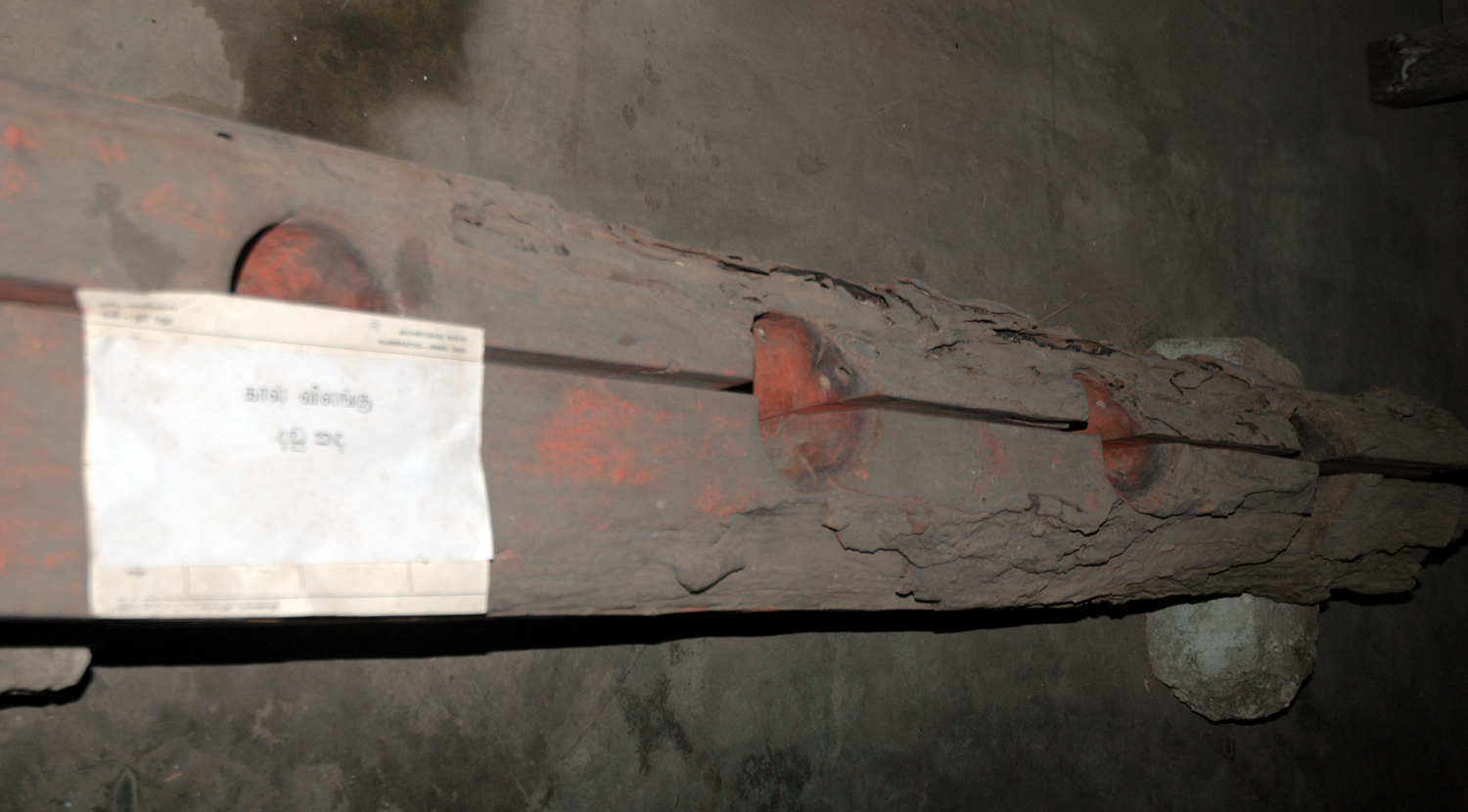
Wooden legcuff at a museum, Sri Lanka

The earliest fetters found in archaeological excavations date from the prehistoric age and are mostly of the puzzle lock type. Some early versions of cup lock shackles existed by the Roman era. These were widely used in medieval times, but their use declined when mass production made the manufacture of locks built into restraints affordable.

Simple fetter types continue to be used, like puzzle lock shackles as the typical slave iron, or irons riveted shut for prisoners being transported to overseas prison camps.

The first built-in locks often were of a simple screw-type, but soon developed into the "Darby" type. In Europe these continued to be used into the middle of the 20th century, whereas in the U.S. from the late 19th century onwards many new designs were invented and produced before handcuffs and leg irons of the Peerless type became the standard several decades ago.

One type of shackle, called an "Oregon Boot" or "Gardner Shackle", was patented in 1866 by the warden of the Oregon State Penitentiary, J. C. Gardner. The shackle consisted of an iron band supported by braces which went down and under the prisoner's foot. The shackle's weight hobbled the prisoner's movements to prevent escape, and long-term use would cause severe injury to the wearer. Use of this type of shackle was ended by the mid-20th century.

== Controversial use ==
In comparison to handcuffs, the wearing of leg irons may be found less restrictive. Thus, the prison authorities in several countries deem their long-term use acceptable. To avoid condoning this controversial practice, the countries of the European Union have banned exporting leg irons into non-EU countries. The countries that continue to make prisoners wear fetters long-term now tend to manufacture their own restraints.

== Gallery ==
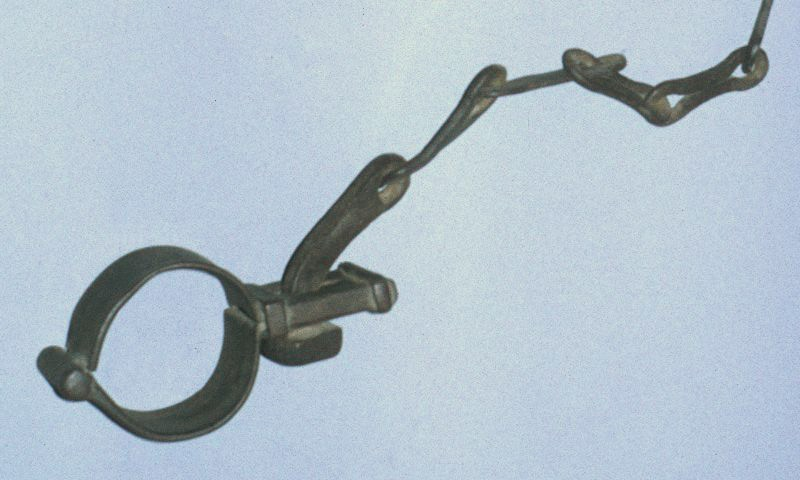
Cup lock shackle with no built-in lock

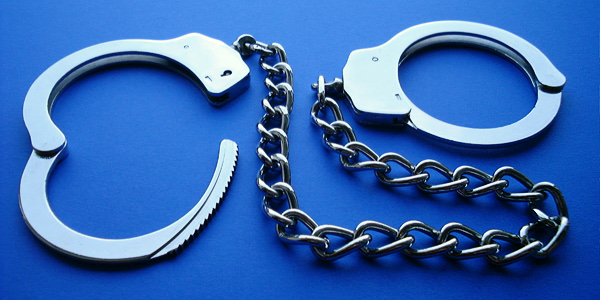
Standard type legcuffs made in Taiwan

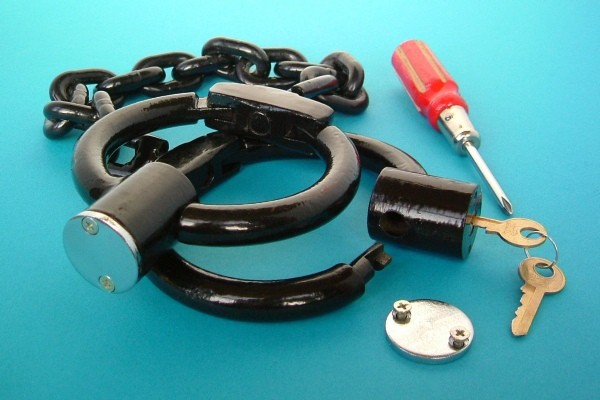
Heavy legcuffs from China, including a metal plate to protect the keyhole from collecting dust or being tampered with

== See also ==
- Ball and chain
- Bilboes
- Electronic tagging
- Handcuffs
- Hobble (device)
- Thumbcuffs
