= Sacking out =

Horse training method

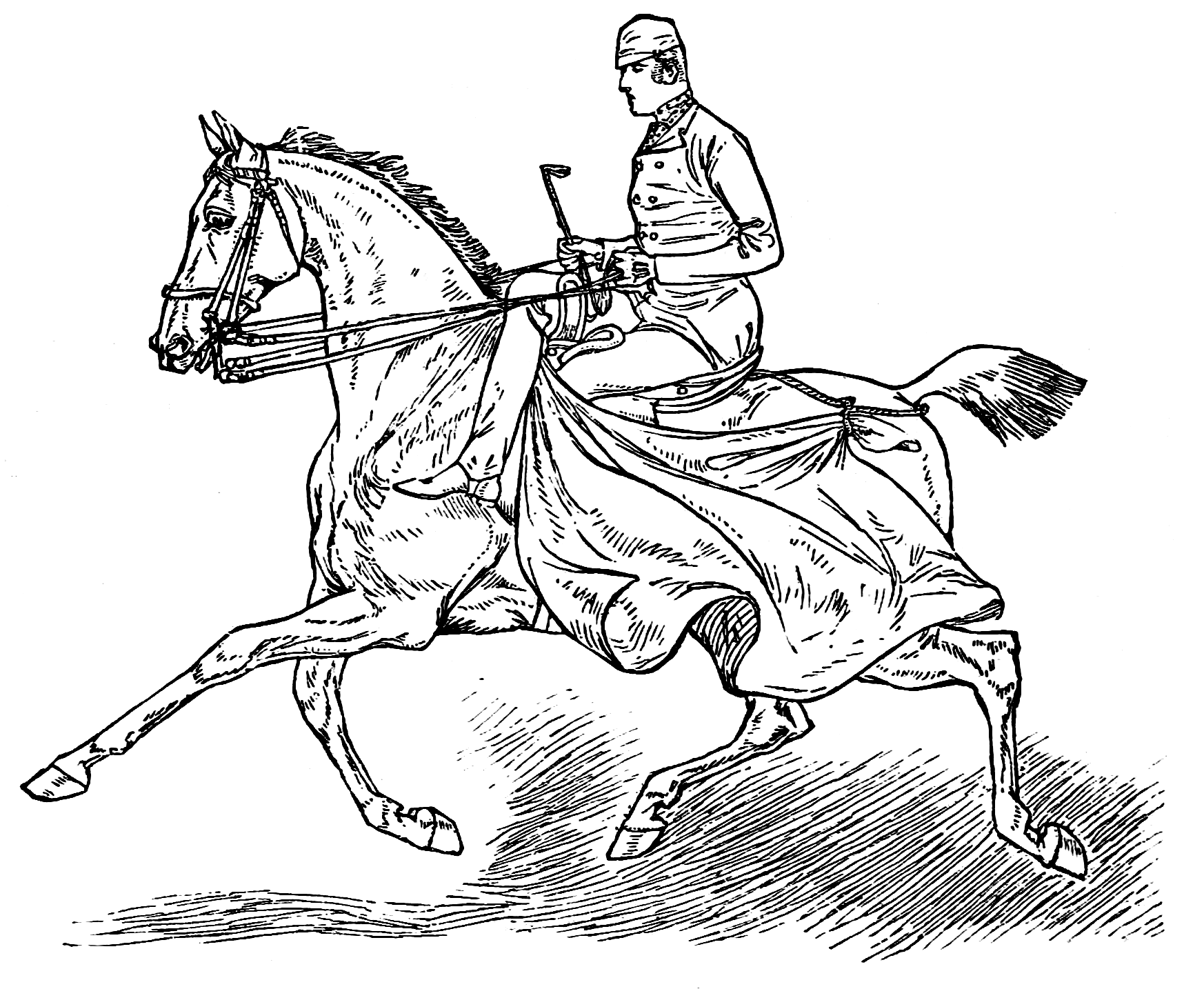
Desensitizing an otherwise trained horse to accept the fluttering skirt of a lady's riding habit

Sacking out is a method used by horse trainers to desensitize a horse to potentially frightening situations or objects. It is a process that, done properly, teaches a horse to not fear certain objects or situations, and, over time can be used to teach a horse to stop and listen to its handler in any potentially frightening situation, thus, in effect, to assess the situation instead of immediately acting upon its fight or flight instinct.

An example of the need for desensitizing training is when an object, such as a plastic bag, suddenly blows across the path of horse and rider, which, if the horse has not been properly desensitized, could result in spooking. Spooking is potentially dangerous, as it can result in fallen riders or horses bolting into danger. Another example would be the need to desensitize a horse to the sound of traffic, music, loudspeakers and other stimuli seen at public events. In some cases, a previous bad experience may have given a horse reason to fear a specific situation, requiring a form of systematic desensitization to gradually overcome its fear.

A typical method to desensitize the horse to things like plastic bags is to begin in a step-by-step process with a mildly worrisome object, such as a towel or blanket. A handler reduces the animal's wariness of a strange object by showing it to the horse in increasingly vigorous ways, first by simply allowing the animal to sniff it, then to touch or rub it gently over the animal until it shows no sign of fear, then, ultimately to flap it and wave it about. Through multiple sessions, the horse will first become accustomed to a specific object, then, as the horse is introduced to additional stimuli, including large blankets, plastic bags and other potentially frightening but harmless objects, the animal learns to not fear items that a human handler presents to it.

There is controversy over various techniques. Some training methods advocate putting only slight pressure on the horse, allowing it to gradually become accustomed to a frightening object, while other methods sometimes advocate techniques that are based on the operant conditioning principle of flooding, for example, waving a large blanket on and over a horse tied to a sturdy post so that it cannot escape -- the latter methods often being quicker at first, but also far more dangerous because rapid exposure to frightening stimuli can cause a horse to panic, and, if tied or confined, to risk injury to the animal or handler in an attempt to free itself.

== See also ==
- Horse behavior
- Horse training
