= Splay (physiology) =

In physiology, splay is the difference between urine threshold (the amount of a substance required in the kidneys before it appears in the urine) and saturation, or T_{M,} where saturation is the exhausted supply of renal reabsorption carriers. In simpler terms, splay is the concentration difference between a substance's maximum renal reabsorption vs. appearance in the urine. Splay is usually used in reference to glucose; other substances, such as phosphate, have virtually no splay at all.

The splay in the glucose titration curve is likely a result of both anatomical and kinetic difference among nephrons. A particular nephron's filtered load of glucose may be mismatched to its capacity to reabsorb glucose. For example, a nephron with a larger glomerulus has a larger load of glucose to reabsorb. Also, different nephrons may have different distributions and densities of SGLT2 and SGLT1 along the proximal tubule and, thus, have different tubular maximum for glucose (TmG). Therefore, some nephrons may excrete before others and also because "the maximum reabsorption rate (or Tm) cannot be achieved until the amount/min of glucose being presented to the renal tubules is great enough to fully saturate the receptor sites". John Field of the American Physiological Society said "Since the splay may occur when the residual nephrons are said to be free of anatomic abnormalities, the possibility exists that changes in the kinetics of glucose reabsorption may have been induced".

One study found that glucose reabsorption exhibited low splay and another also found that the titration curves for glycine showed a large amount of splay whereas those for lysine showed none and the kinetics of carrier-mediated glucose transport possibly explains the level of splay in renal titration curves. As splay can be clinically important, patients with proximal tubule disease, mainly caused by hereditary nature and often in children, have a lower threshold but a normal Tm. Therefore, splay is suggested, probably because "some individual cotransporters have a low glucose affinity but maximal transport rate (renal glycosuria). Studies also show that if sulfate is reabsorbed by a Tm-limited process, it will have low splay and, in animals, the limits of citrate concentration normal in the body, citrate titration curves show a large amount of splay therefore a Tm for citrate reabsorption may actually happen. Also, tubular transport is Tm-limited and the reabsorption mechanism being saturated at a plasma concentration more than 20 times than usual shows a low level of splay. Renal abnormalities of glucose excretion, causing glycosuria, may happen as either a result of reduced Tm for glucose or because of an abnormally wide range of nephron heterogeneity so splay of the glucose excretion curve is increased. Two causes are also listed for splay: "heteroginicity in glomerular size, proximal tubular length and number of carrier proteins for glucose reabsorption" and variability of TmG nephrons. Splay also occurs between 180 and 350 mg/dL %.
