= Eva Ring =

Female horse racing jockey

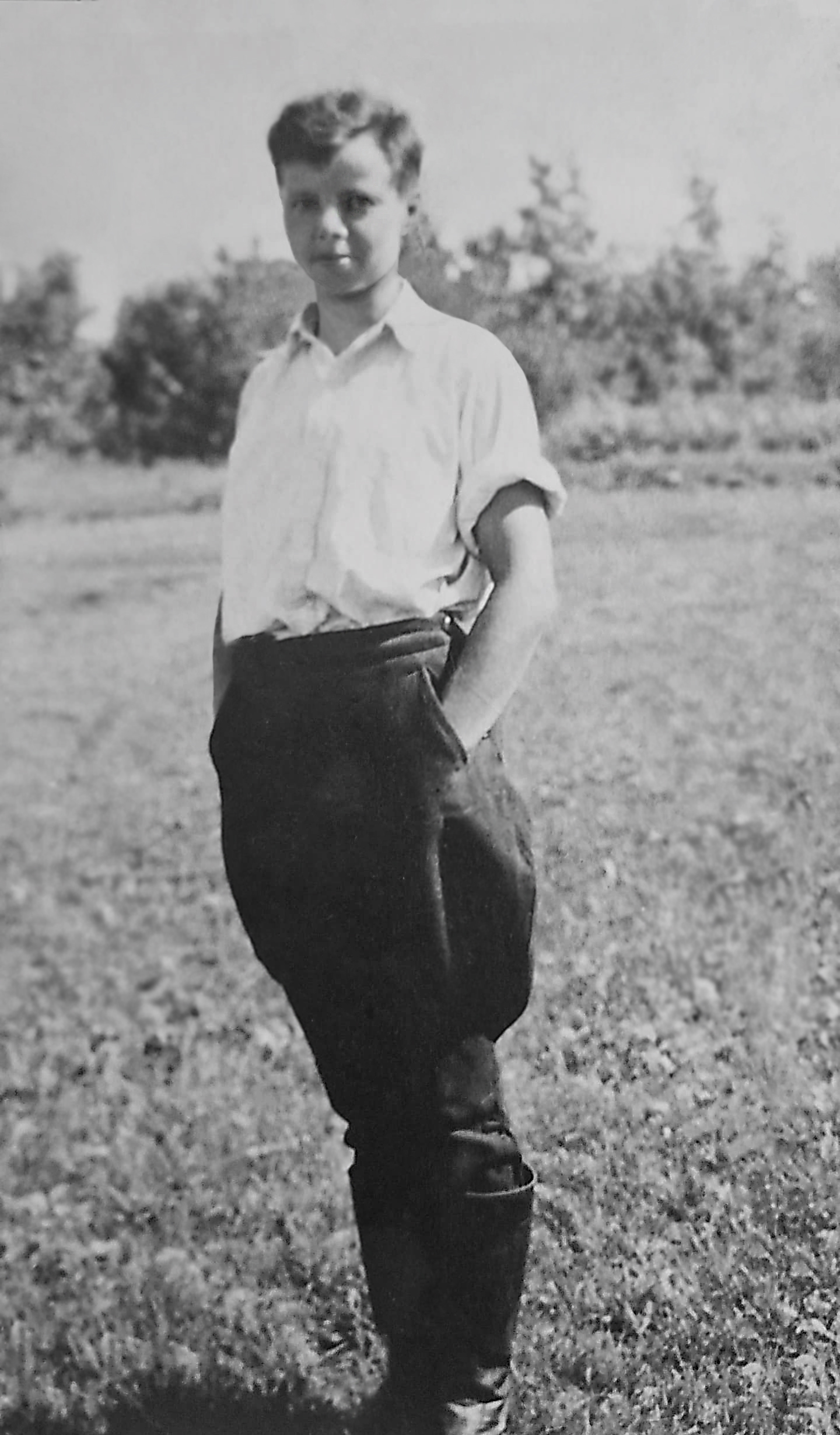
- Racehorse jockey Eva Ring (1930s)

Personal information
- Full name: Eva Mae Campbell
- Other names: Eva Mae Campbell Ring Roberts
- Born: 24 June 1911 Edmonton, Alberta, Canada
- Died: 22 December 1989 (aged 78) Edmonton, Alberta, Canada
- Resting place: Evergreen Memorial Gardens
- Occupations: Jockey, race horse trainer
- Height: 5 ft 1 in (1.55 m)
- Weight: 108 lb (49 kg)
- Spouses: Walter J. Ring (divorced 1956); Robert Roberts (death 1979)

Horse racing career
- Sport: Horse racing

Significant horses
- Calamity Jane, Liberty Boy, Pussy Boots, Bully Bay

Eva Ring (1911–1989) was among the first female jockeys to ride and train winning race horses in Canada in the 1930s–1940s. It was a time in North American history when women were not permitted to obtain a jockey license or ride in flat races alongside their male counterparts, but Ring was a trailblazer and managed to overcome many of the obstacles of her time. Discrimination was not a situation unique to North America; rather, it was a global issue in the male dominated sport of Thoroughbred racing, the "Sport of Kings". In 2026, Ring was inducted into the Canadian Horse Racing Hall of Fame as a "Legend", marking the association's "50th year of honouring the best in Canadian racing".

To be able to ride, some women would show up at the racetrack disguised as a male jockey. Ring's early photographs serve as a testament to her disguise. Ring competed as a female jockey at venues where a jockey license was not required, such as bush track races, county fairs, and local recreational parks and exhibition centers where female jockeys were the exhibit. Some of those venues sported a grandstand and the semblance of a race oval but without a starting gate, such as the South Side Athletic Park in Edmonton. Ring was considered "well-known to horse and racing fans", and because of her outstanding riding abilities, was covered as a favorite in the Sports section of regional newspapers, such as the Edmonton Journal.

Sometime around mid to late 1940s, Ring retired as a jockey and focused her attention on training racehorses. She was a licensed trainer, and one of the few female racehorse trainers on the Western Circuit in Canada. She attracted the attention of racehorse enthusiast Bill Little, a hotel owner in Rosetown, Saskatchewan. He was an up-and-coming breeder of Thoroughbred racehorses, and owned a large breeding operation known as Swift Water Stud. Little hired Ring as his trainer sometime around 1946, and considered her and his stable manager, Fred Jones, to be "a winning combination". Ring was not only training his horses to run, Little said "she breaks them and gallops them" and "does about everything but ride in the races." Whenever Ring arrived at a race with Pussy Boots and Liberty Boy in Little's string of racehorses, it attracted media attention.

== Background ==
From 1937 to 1941, Canada was struggling through The Great Depression and the start of World War II, but it did not stop people from attending horse races. It was inexpensive entertainment if one could resist trips to the betting window and simply watch the races. For religious reasons, there were no races held on Sunday. In the U.S., state governments saw horse racing as a potential "honey pot" to replenish their shrinking coffers. They increased taxes on racing revenues in exchange for legalized betting, which in turn, enticed business investors and increased the number of race tracks by 70%. Female jockeys did not benefit from that growth because, at the time, they were barred from obtaining a jockey license and competing in the same high stakes races as their male counterparts. That didn't change until 1968.

== A history of discrimination ==
Cartoon depiction of the female jockeys competing in the Powder Puff Derby. The cartoon was published in the Calgary Harold, August 22, 1940

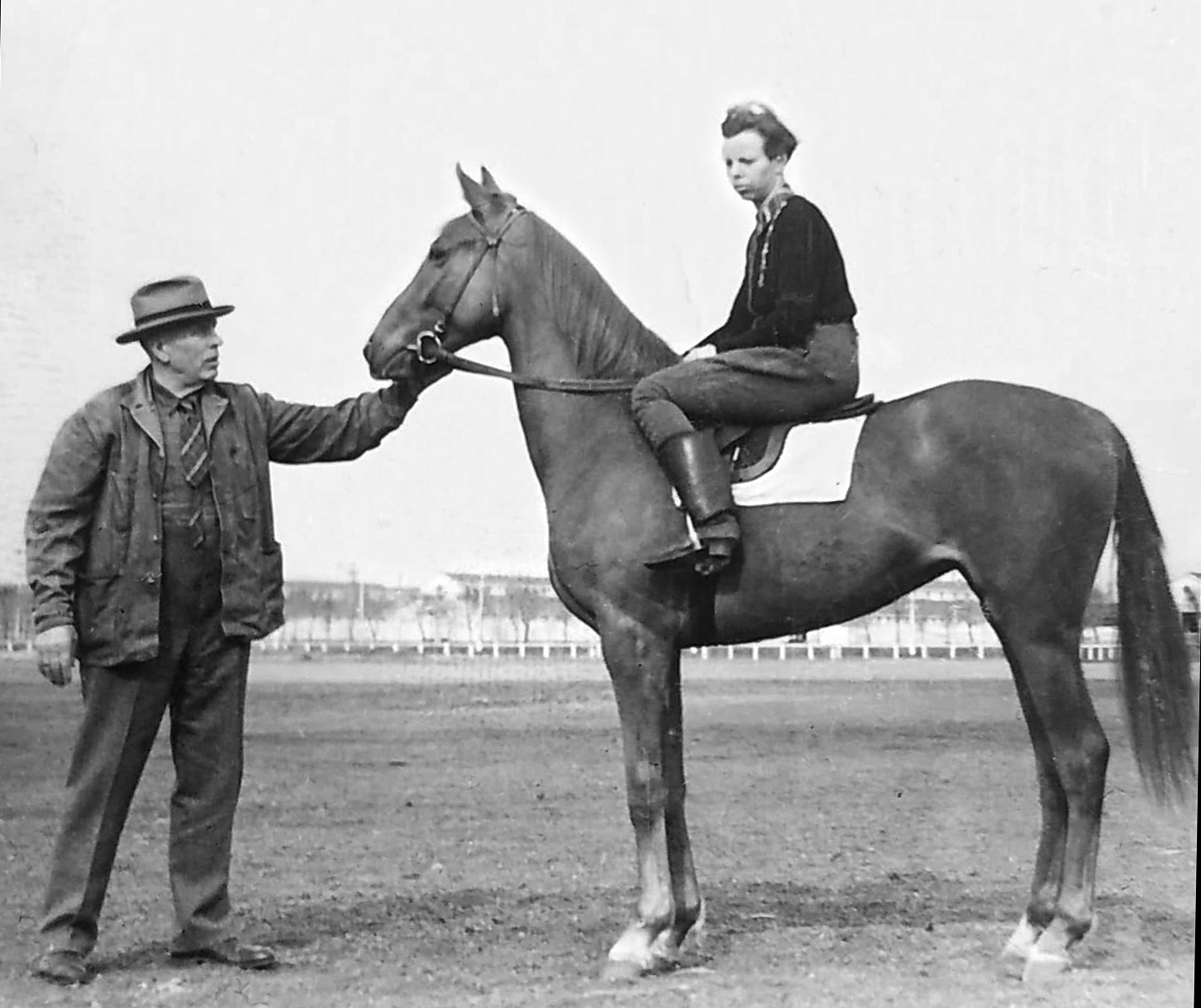
Jockey Eva Ring astride a race horse

Because of her gender, Ring, like other female trailblazers of the time, was limited to races held at bush tracks, in local parks, and at county fairs rather than being allowed to jockey at the more prestigious races that offered large purses, such as the major stakes races at Woodbine Racetrack, Santa Anita Park, Pimlico Race Course and Churchill Downs, to name a few. Women were allowed to ride in feature races for women only such as the Powder Puff Derby held at the historic Chinook Park racetrack in Calgary. They were also allowed to train racehorses, but they typically had to obtain their trainer's license using the name of a male friend.

Discrimination against female jockeys was not unique to Canada; rather, it has been a global issue for centuries. In Britain, Jockey Club rules banned women from riding in races until 1972, at which time a series of flat races had been approved for female jockeys but were restricted to female riders only. The Sex Discrimination Act 1975 in Britain afforded Alex Greaves the opportunity to become the first female jockey to ride in the prestigious 1996 Epsom Derby (at 500-1 odds), but it came decades after the act was passed.

In 1939, Anna Lee Aldred at age 18 was reluctantly granted a jockey's license to race at Agua Caliente Racetrack in Tijuana, Mexico, making her the first licensed female jockey to compete despite the failed attempts by racetrack officials to find a rule to prevent it. Aldred was given a small wooden badge that represented a jockey's license. In 1968, Kathy Kusner became the first female jockey in the U.S. to be granted a standard flat track jockey's license from a major racing jurisdiction, but only after she filed a lawsuit against the Maryland Racing Commission that resulted in a year-long legal battle. In September 1968, Circuit Judge Ernest A. Loveless overturned the commission's denial.

“The commission could never push aside the fact that she was a female entering into the jockey profession,” Loveless said. “The evidence before the commission and the acts of the commissioners themselves show that the petitioner has been substantially prejudiced.” ~ Judge Lovelace

On March 1, 1969 Tuesdee Testa, Santa Anita's first female jockey, won her second career mount. On that same day at Florida Downs, Diane Crump achieved her first race win. Crump was the first female in the U.S. to compete as a professional jockey in a pari-mutuel race, "despite boycotts, hecklers and a dubious society". She was also the first female jockey to ride in the Kentucky Derby. Francine Villeneuve acquired her jockey's license in 1987, and became the first female to ride and place in the Queen's Plate, Canada's oldest and most prestigious race. Chantal Sutherland raced in the US and Canada but it wasn't until the year 2000 that she began her career as a licensed jockey. She was another trail blazer who loved the sport, and helped pave the way for other women to become licensed jockeys.

It wasn't until the early 21st Century that female jockeys were given opportunities to compete globally in the most prestigious races with large purses, such as the 10 million Dubai World Cup. There has been noticeable progress for female jockeys over the years, but they are still facing many of the same issues the earliest female jockeys were facing during Eva Ring's time. They are still being discriminated against despite research that has demonstrated women ride as well as men. Some have also been subjected to sexual harassment and bullying.

== Horse racing career ==
=== Racing and jumping ===
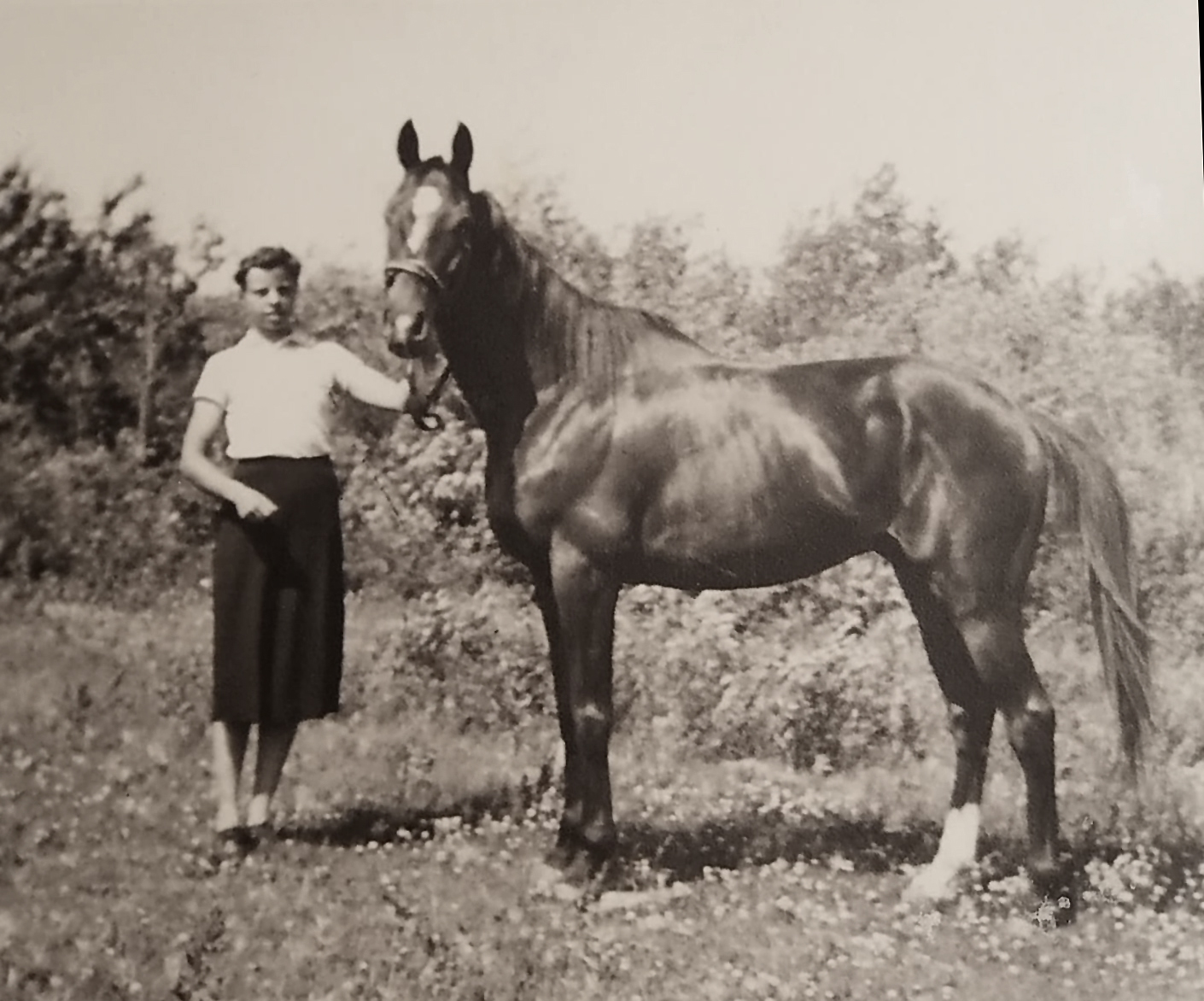
Eva Ring with Calamity Jane (1930s)

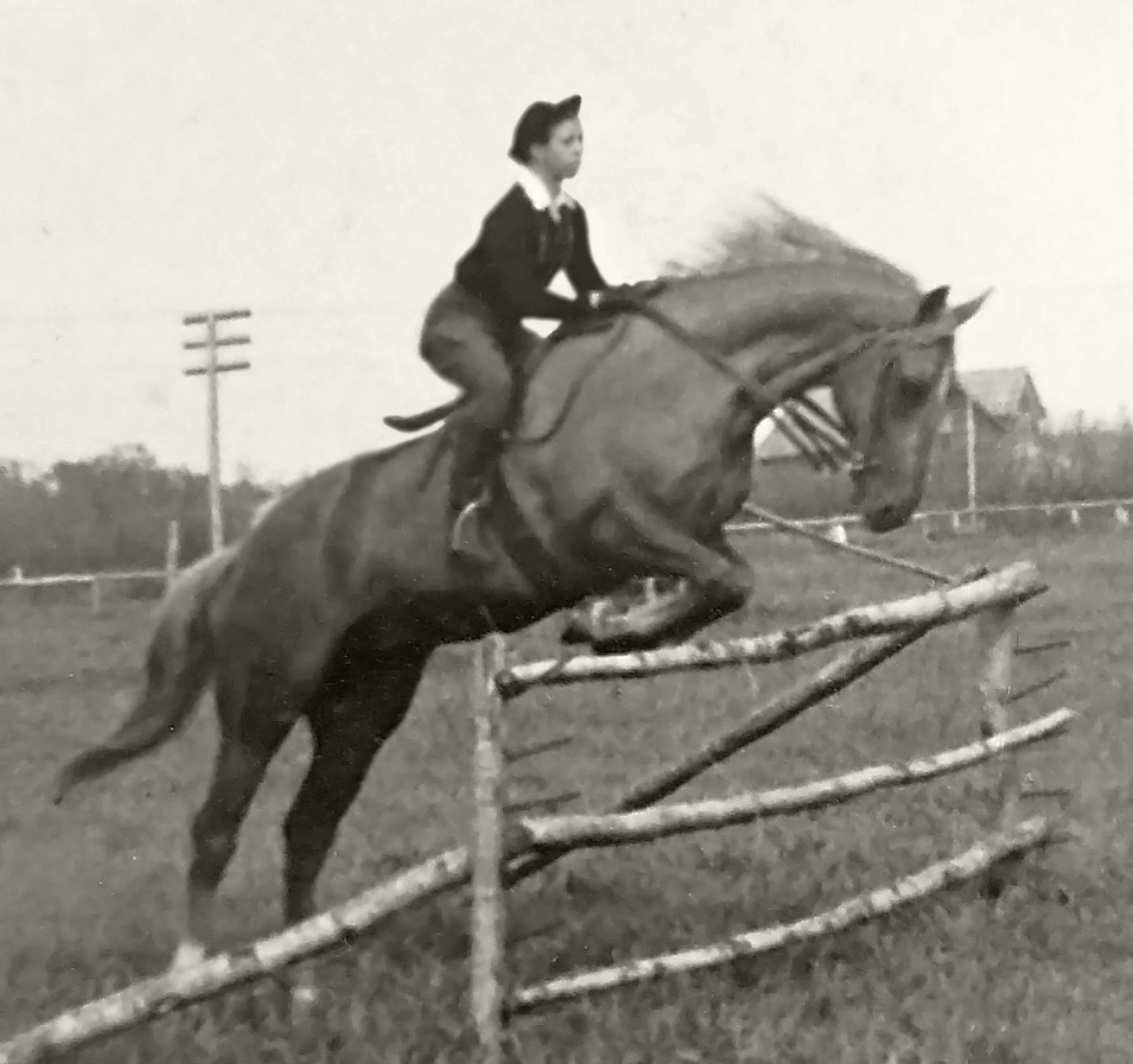
Eva Ring in jumping horse competition (1930s)

On July 2, 1938, at the South Side Athletic Park Spring Meet, Ring won two of the seven races, including the second race astride Bully Bay, and the sixth race astride a halfbred Thoroughbred mare named Calamity Jane. But not all victories end with a victory celebration, as evidenced by the seventh race of the meet. There were no starting gates at South Side racetrack; therefore, at the start of each race, jockeys had to ride their horses up to the designated starter and get underway. Ring was astride outsider Lord Avondale and broke at the start to gain four lengths on the field in what became the "disputed seventh race". Race fans booed with disapproval and threw cushions onto the track because the horse Dawn Breeze was blocked at the start and lost any chance of winning. The favored horse Budover passed Lord Avondale to win the race, while Voltear gained ground from behind and placed second to Lord Avondale's third-place finish. The Royal Canadian Mounted Police moved in after the race and stated that changes had to made for Saturday's program to which track manager, Jimmy Smith, responded: "We'll have good starts if the horses have to be standing stock still when the race bell rings."

The following day, Ring garnered attention after winning yet another race at South Side astride Calamity Jane. The leading headline of the column on page 10 of the Sports section reads: "Girl Jockey, Eva Ring, Scores Win With Calamity Jane". The sports columnist for the Edmonton Journal stated her victory was "Probably the biggest upset of the card". The win returned the second-highest money of the day, paying $6.70 on a dollar bet.

Ring also garnered attention in 1941 as one of the out-of-town riders competing in both the Powder Puff Derby and the Beaux and Belles race held in Calgary. In the Sports section of the Calgary Herald, Ring was introduced as the out-of-towner who had "gained such a reputation as a rider that many patrons bet on her mounts simply because she is in the saddle." On August 20, 1941, Chinook Park racetrack in Calgary hosted the Beaux and Belles feature race, distance six furlongs, with a field of 8 horses, each to be ridden by one of 8 jockeys consisting of 4 regulars (males) and 4 females. The females were given a 13-pound advantage. The owners of the horses remained unaware of which jockey would be mounted on their respective horses until post time.

Mrs. Ring should be right at home here, too...She has always been racing against regular jockeys and, in the past at the South Side track, she has been probably the best of all the riders present...If she draws a horse that can run, she will have a good chance of winning the Beaux and Belles' event. ~ Ken McConnell, From the Sports Mill

The female jockeys dominated the race despite the heavy track. Miss K. Allen astride Russian Bank finished first by a short head beating Mrs. Finch on Mortgage Lifter. Freddy Soloman, one of the more experienced regulars, finished third on Cave Boy. Ring was astride Chinese Custom, and led the pack early but was overtaken and finished 6th.

The race was a thrilling one from start to finish and brought about considerable surprise to the fans who had overlooked the lady riders when buying their pari-mutuel tickets. Russian Bank, a noted heavy track performer, returned $11.50. Cave Boy came in for a heavy play but was a badly beaten third. ~Bob Mamini, Sports Editor

Again in 1941, Ring was riding the race favorite, Miss Kay, and got off to a bad start because of the old style barrier at the South Side racetrack; it appeared she was "left at the post" but upon circling the field she managed to gain on the leader. As she approached, she was struck in the head with a rock that was kicked-up by the horse in front of her. She kept riding and managed to finish 2nd in the race. Upon arriving at the judge's stand, she unsaddled Miss Kay, "then calmly walked off the course to get medical attention." She returned in time for the next race, and won it riding her own horse, Calamity Jane.

Ring also participated in show jumping and other types of horse racing events. It was common for some horse racing venues to also host horse shows.

Ring and a few other Canadian female jockeys were considered "well-known to horse and racing fans". Most competed in the annual "Calgary Town Plate", more commonly known as the "Powder Puff Derby", that was first held in 1940, but Ring did not compete that year. The Calgary Herald published a rather controversial cartoon montage that depicted female jockeys as blonde bimbo types rather than portraying them as serious professionals competing in a what some may consider an extreme and very dangerous sport.

Ring was one of seven qualifiers competing in the 1941 Powder Puff Derby, and was included in the group picture that was published in The Calgary Herald, and a few days later in the Edmonton Journal with the headline "Edmonton's Mrs. E. Ring to Compete in Powder Puff Derby at Chinook Park Today". Ring's horse for the Derby was Tab's Bid. The Calgary Herald published a short clip about the race which began as follows:

"They pickle peaches and preserve jam in their spare time - when they have any - but most of them have a calendar as crowded as a debutante's. Running a home, looking after one or two children in some cases, and participating in sports of many kinds keeps them as busy as the proverbial bee." ~ Calgary Herald, 'Powder Puff' Riders All Set For Big Race

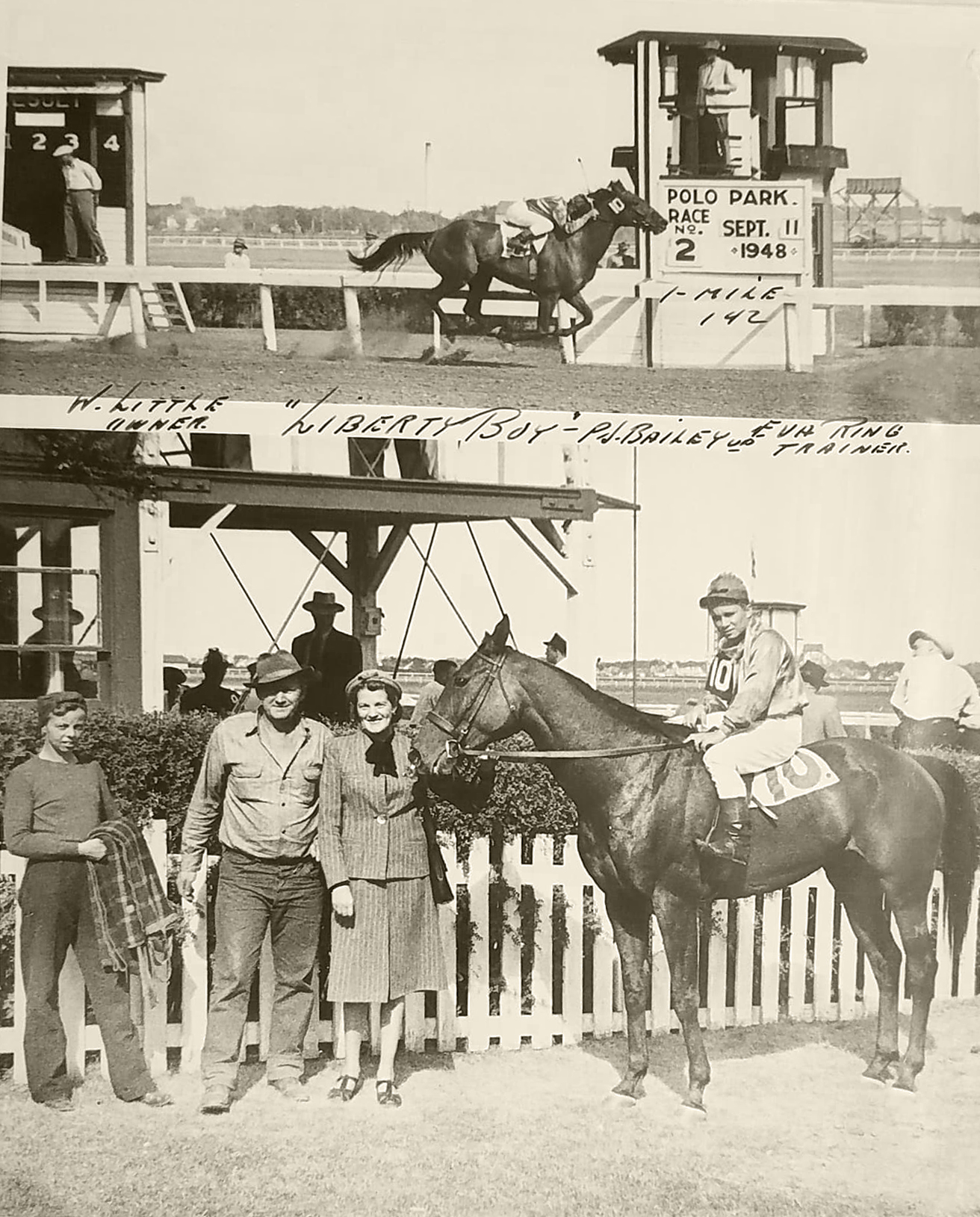
Trainer Eva Ring (far left)

The clip ended with the following:

"And why is the event called a "powder puff derby"?

"Because we all carry a powder-puff." said this young lady, whipping hers out of her pocket and setting to work.

In the August 1942 Sports Gymkana held at Briercrest Farm, Ring teamed-up with Ruth Stevenson to place 2nd in the pair jumping, and then she won the open jumping on Cavalier. The Powder Puff Derby was held later that month and was presented by the Saskatoon Riding Club as one of several featured riding events in the Labor Day Gymkana, sponsored by members of the Northern Alberta Light Horse Society. There were 5,000 people in attendance at the Edmonton exhibition grounds. The featured riding events included harness racing, a musical demonstration of horsemanship skills, "jumping with blanket only", and "pair jumping" that Ring and her teammate Ruth Stevenson placed 2nd in. The Powder Puff Derby was won by Neta Robbins.

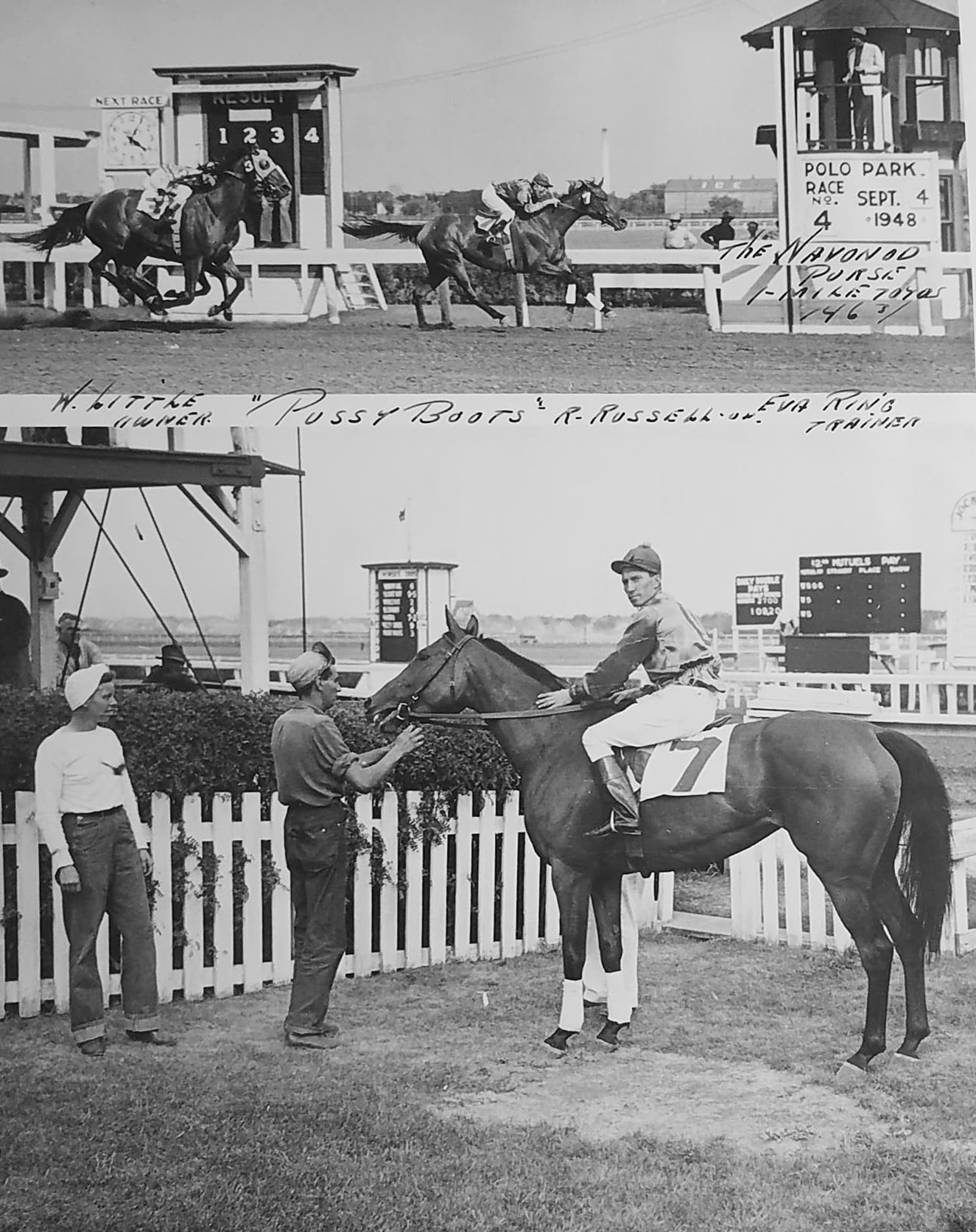
Trainer Eva Ring (far left)

In 1943, Ring qualified out of twelve entries to compete in the Powder Puff Derby 6-horse field in Calgary. The race was held at Victoria Park, Calgary, and was restricted to "lady riders" and "Thoroughbred and half-breds who have never raced on a major race course." Some Star ridden by Mrs. A. Finch won the race by a length ahead of Little Barb with Mrs. Joan Hawes astride. Edna S. ridden by Mrs. C. Simpson was 3rd. In September that same year, Ring attended the Edmonton Saddle Club's Gymkana, and placed in various horse races and jumping events.

=== Licensed Thoroughbred trainer ===
In the late 1940s, after Ring retired as a jockey, she became notable as one of few women trainers on the western circuit in Canada. She trained Thoroughbred race horses for Bill Little, a hotel owner in Rosetown who at the time was an up-and-coming Thoroughbred racehorse owner and breeder. He owned Swift Water Stud, a large Thoroughbred breeding establishment in Saskatchewan, which means "swift water", and his racing colors consisted of a blue jacket and red cap. Little considered Ring and his stable manager Fred Jones to be "a winning combination". Ring not only trained his horses to run, Little added that "she breaks them and gallops them" and "does about everything but ride in the races." A few of the notable horses that Ring trained for him included Pussy Boots by Yankee Doodle out of Double Foot, and Liberty Boy by Lynnwood out of Goddess of Liberty in the string of seven that raced in 1947–1948.

Horse racing is not always about fun and excitement or the thrill of victory. Being a race horse trainer carries substantial responsibility, especially when hauling to various races. On or about August 31, 1946, Ring and Fred Jones had hauled to the Polo Park Fall Meet with a string of race horses for owner Bill Little. A fire broke out in one of the barns, believed to have started in the feed room of the K and K stable, possibly "originated from a small oil burner which had been lighted by some stable hands against fire rules enforced in the area of the barns." It spread quickly to Barn B were 35 head of horses were stabled awaiting the start of the race that day, including Pussy Boots and several others Ring was hauling. She and Jones were among the first to see the fire and start freeing horses. One of the horses they freed was 4-year-old High Bluff, a top Thoroughbred in the K and K stable. After freeing him, they closed the stall door, but witnessed someone else open the stall door and allow the horse to run back into his stall. The fire raged quickly as stable help took risks to free horses, leading some out on shanks while others were let out of their stalls, free to run. During the panic "such queries as 'Has anyone seen Pussy Boots' or 'What happened to Yorkton?' were heard." Barn B burned quickly to the ground. All totaled, only two horses perished in the fire, one of whom was High Bluff, and the other was Neil Strome. All the other horses were safely rounded-up, and the race carried on that day as scheduled.

=== CHR Hall of Fame ===
Ring's later recognition by the Canadian Horse Racing Hall of Fame placed her career within the history of women who participated in Canadian racing despite institutional barriers that prevented women from obtaining jockey licenses and competing in ordinary flat races alongside men. She was selected as part of the Hall of Fame's Class of 2026 in the Legend category, which recognizes horses and people whose Canadian horse racing accomplishments occurred at least 50 years before induction. Her selection recognized her role as a Prairie jockey in the 1930s and 1940s, her participation in both women-only and mixed races, and her 1949 trainer's license from the Prairie Thoroughbred Breeders Racing Association. The Class of 2026 was scheduled for induction on 12 August 2026 at the Mississauga Convention Centre in Mississauga, Ontario.

Eva Ring Trainer
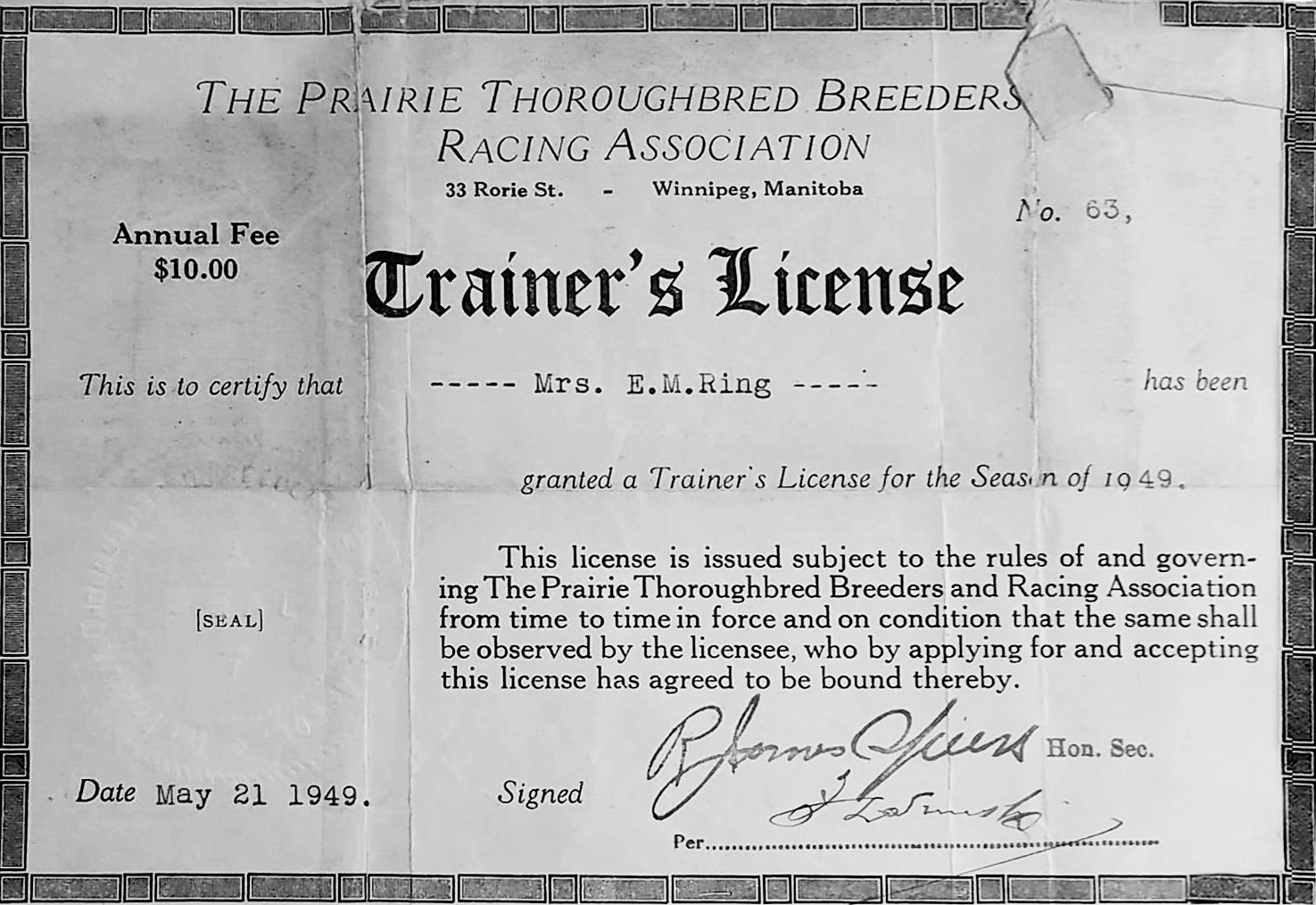
Women could obtain a trainer's license, but not a jockey's license.

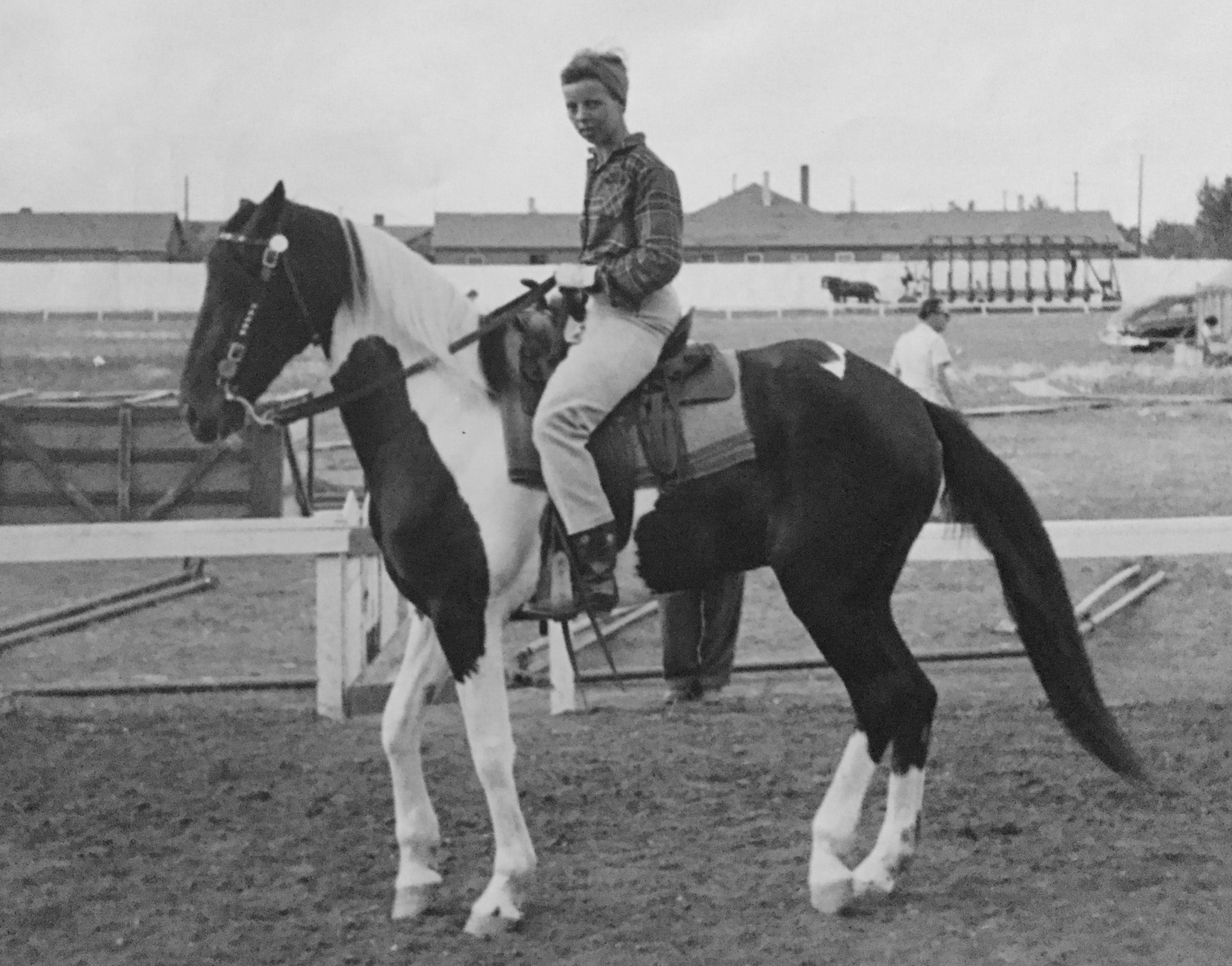
Pony horses, or track horses are used by trainers and exercise riders to escort racehorses to and from the track.

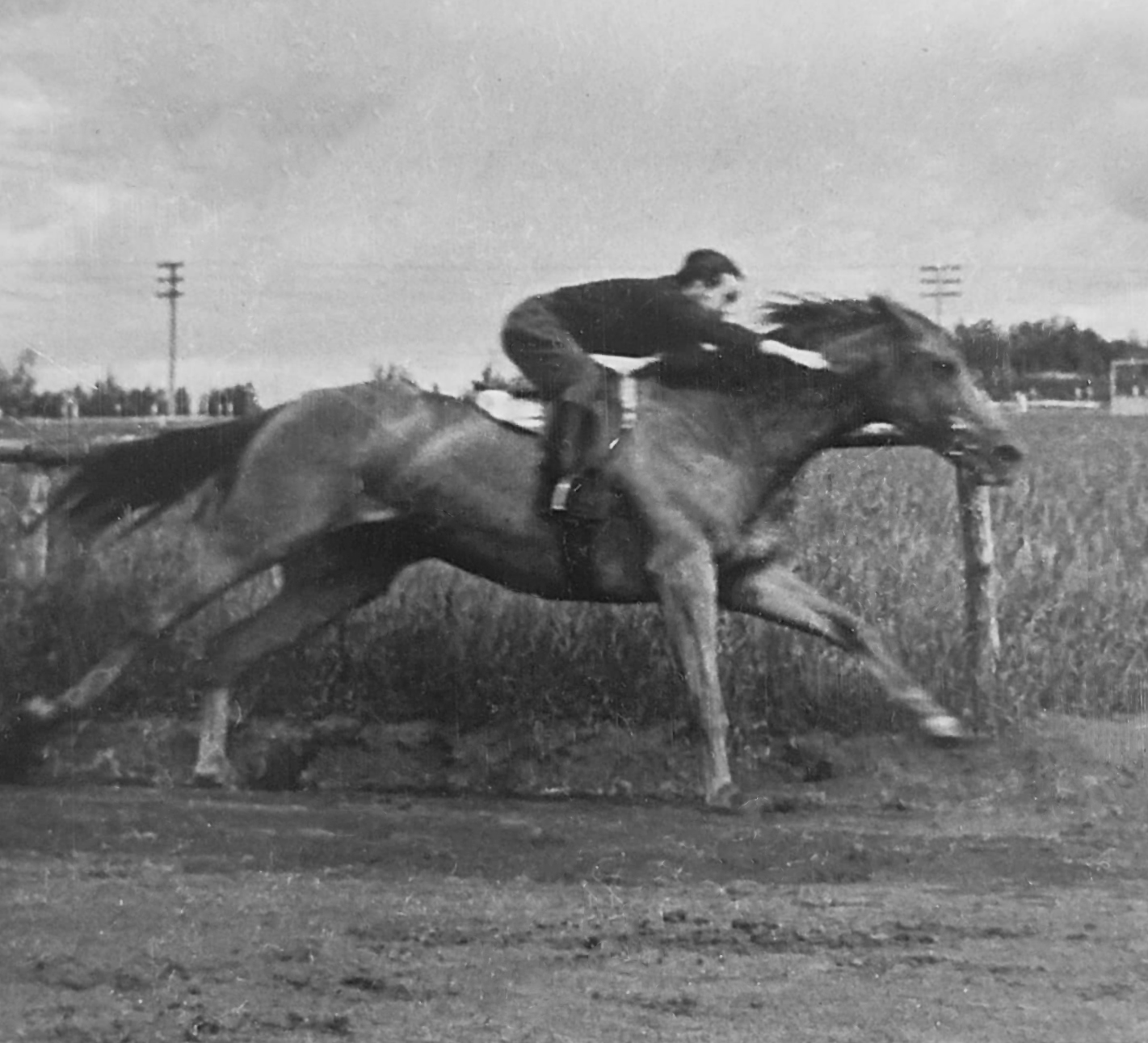
Eva Ring is breezing a racehorse.

== See also ==
- Horse racing
- List of horse racing venues
- Commercial animal cloning
- Fully automatic time
- Glossary of North American horse racing
- Going (horse racing)
- Horse length
- Horse racing equipment
- Australian and New Zealand punting glossary
- Jockey Challenge
- List of jockeys
- Match race
