= Tuesdee Testa =

American jockey (born 1941)

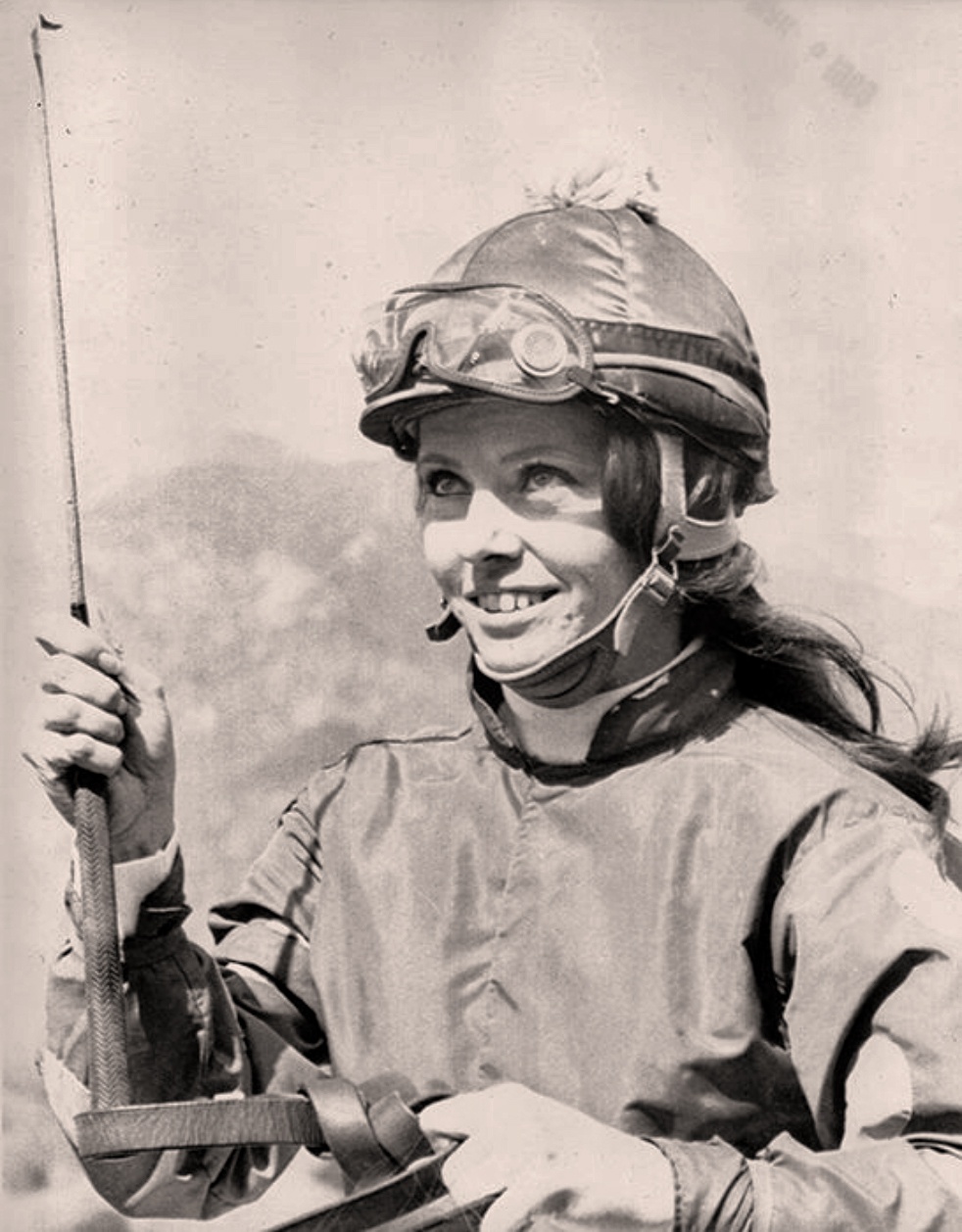
- Tuesdee Testa, age 27, waving her crop to a standing ovation from a crowd of 45,000 at Santa Anita Park on March 1, 1969

Personal information
- Full name: Helen Shipton
- Born: 1941 Cherry Hill, New Jersey, U.S.
- Occupations: Jockey, race horse trainer
- Height: 5 ft 2 in (1.57 m)
- Weight: 112 lb (51 kg)

Horse racing career
- Sport: Horse racing

Tuesdee Testa (née Shipton; born 1941) is an American former jockey who was the first female jockey to race at Santa Anita Park and was one of the first woman to win a race at a major thoroughbred race track in the United States. Testa's historic win occurred on March 1, 1969, in the third race of the day at Santa Anita. She rode Buzz On, the second mount of her career, and won the race by a neck in a photo-finish to defeat Tony Diaz astride Just Aime. She ran her first race at Santa Anita the week before, and finished last in a field of 12. Historically, it was still a milestone for female jockeys and Santa Anita Park, but her win is the one that will live in the annals of racing history: decades later, her breakthrough feat was being cited by newspapers as a milestone in sports history.

Testa received a standing ovation from a crowd of 45,000 for her historic first win as a licensed jockey in California. Her emotion during that historic moment in time reflects in her smile as she waved her crop to the crowd while sitting astride Buzz On, the horse she rode to victory. The photograph was captured by Santa Anita Park and widely circulated in a press release by UPI to member news sources. The photograph not only represents Testa's victory, it represents a substantial victory for women around the world as a reminder of the barrier, now broken, that once barred females from obtaining a jockey license and being allowed to race on major racetracks.

Male jockeys dominated the sport of racing, and many saw women as inferior and incapable of riding a powerful race horse; many expressed concern over the safety of other jockeys during a race. They rejected their female counterparts and expressed their opposition by boycotting races. The New Yorker's longtime horse racing columnist, Audax Minor, wrote about Testa's race at Aqueduct soon after her Santa Anita triumph. Riding Bargain Counter and approaching an opening in the far turn to take the lead, "the boys did not pull out and let her through — as they sometimes did for [Eddie] Arcaro — but closed the gap", requiring her to go far outside and finish well back. There were also occasions when spectators voiced their disapproval of female jockeys during the post parade, but the women did not relent. They chose instead to work with people who believed in them and helped them find ways to achieve their goals.

== Early beginnings ==
Born Helen Shipton from Cherry Hill, New Jersey, Tuesdee was the name given to her by her grandmother. Testa grew up next door to horse trainer Everett W. King, described by journalist Jim Murray (1969) as a "crusty old party". Testa worked as an exercise rider for King but had her sights set on becoming a jockey. She barrel raced throughout her childhood.

The late 1960s was a time in US history when the doors were closed to female jockeys. The Jockeys' Guild issued a statement expressing their concerns and reasons for their opposition to females competing against male jockeys. Nick Jemas, the Guild's national managing director at the time and a former jockey himself, said in reference to the "cool judgment and skill of a fellow jockey" during a race, "A woman's emotional makeup might betray her at a time like that. It could also imperil the lives of the other jockeys, not to mention her own." If a female jockey entered a race, the male jockeys would stage a boycott. Spectators also expressed their disapproval for female jockeys by booing and yelling insults as they rode onto the track during the rose parade.

Women found various ways to overcome the obstacles that prevented them from receiving a jockey's license. They worked hard, and sought support by networking with people who could help them on their difficult journey to acceptance. Some even sued or threatened to sue for discrimination under the Civil Rights Act of 1964. Attitudes changed as more females received their jockey's license and rode to the winner's circle, proving their ability to be formidable competitors.

On March 2, 1969, "The crowd gave Mrs. Testa a tremendous ovation when she came back to the winner's circle" after winning the third race at Santa Anita Park riding Buz On, paying $9.20 to win, $6.00 to place and $3.80 to show. The year 2019 marks 50 years since the doors first opened to allow female jockeys to compete against male jockeys on major racetracks in the US. Female jockeys comprise only eight percent of the Jockeys' Guild membership.

Testa became the first woman jockey to ride a race at Monmouth Park in New Jersey when she rode Verbosity in a race on June 6, 1969.

=== Dark Mirage ===
At age 25, Testa was the regular exercise rider for Dark Mirage (1965), a small, dark brown thoroughbred filly referred to as "pint-sized" and affectionately known as an "equine prankster" which earned her the nickname "Tiny Tigress". Testa also fed, walked and groomed the filly, and became quite attached to her. As a three-year-old, Dark Mirage began the season with a defeat at Aqueduct, finishing fourth behind the winning horse ridden by Ron Turcotte; however, that defeat led to a remarkable turn-around and nine consecutive wins, including eight stakes races.

Dark Mirage was the 1968 Champion Three-year-old Filly. She set track records, winning the Acorn Stakes by 6 lengths, Mother Goose by 10 lengths and Coaching Club American Oaks by 12 lengths, which comprised the 3 legs of the American Triple Tiara of Thoroughbred Racing, formerly known as the Filly Triple Crown or New York Filly Triple Tiara that was originally hosted at Belmont Park (1957-2002 and 2007–2009). Her clocked time in the Acorn matched that of the Belmont track record at the time. Her finish in the CC American Oaks was the fastest ever clocked for that track. Steve Cady with the New York Times stated, "...When she reached the finish, ears cocked and neck bowed, she was galloping along with no more apparent effort than a saddle horse out for leisurely bridle-path canter."

As a four-year-old, Dark Mirage ran the Santa Maria Handicap marking her 10th win. Her next race was the 1969 Santa Margarita Invitational Handicap. Bion Abbott of the Los Angeles Times described trainer Everett King's position going into that race as leading with "a couple of queens in his hand", referring to Dark Mirage, and Testa, who he described as "5-foot 2, eyes of blue, 35-23-36, a trim 112 pounds and the first feminine jockey in Santa Anita history." He wrote that Testa's jockey career at that moment was less important than what she had accomplished preparing Dark Mirage for that day's mile and one-eighth race. Unfortunately, it was the last race for Dark Mirage. She dislocated the sesamoid bone in her right front ankle and was retired with career earnings of $362,788. The surgeries to repair her injury were unsuccessful and in 1969, when she was no longer able to stand, she was euthanized. Dark Mirage was inducted into the National Museum of Racing and Hall of Fame in 1974.

== Personal life and later years ==
At the time of her historic Santa Anita victory, Testa was married and had a 2-year-old daughter. Testa raced competitively as a jockey for two years and had about 100 wins. She eventually settled in a rural area near Davie, Florida, where she was one of a group of 54 volunteers riding on horseback with a Crime Watch Mounted Patrol in 1986. Testa then worked as a trainer at Remington Park in Oklahoma City, Oklahoma, after it opened in 1988.
