= Jockey Challenge =

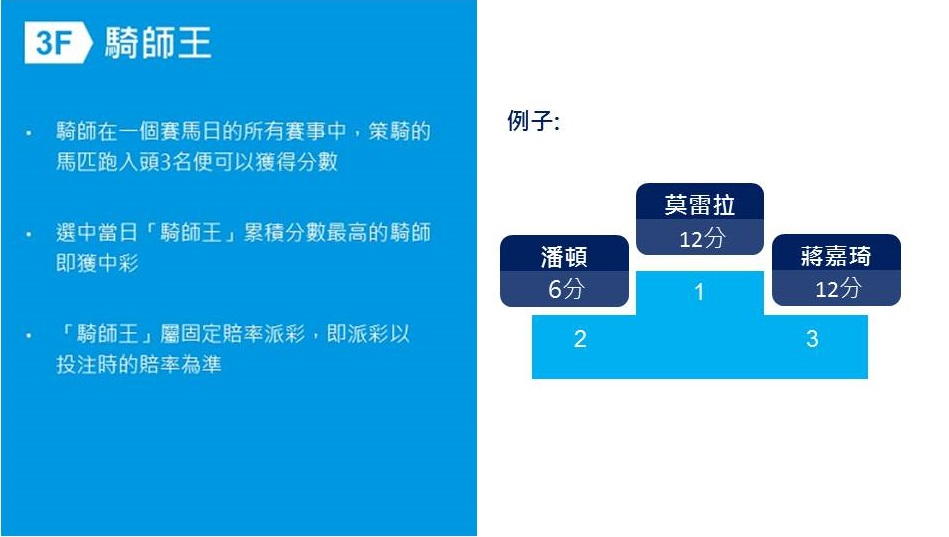

Jockey Challenge is a betting option in horse racing in Hong Kong.

Jockey Challenge involves using a Fixed Odds bet type. Once a bet is placed, the dividend is calculated according to the odds fixed at the time the bet is accepted and will not be affected by any subsequent change in odds. The player has to select correctly the jockey with the most Jockey Challenge points at a race meeting.

== How to play ==
Jockeys participating in the nominated races at a race meeting will be numbered as 1 to 14. Each jockey will be assigned a number from 1 to 13, while No.14 will include the rest of the jockeys riding at the race meeting. Select correctly the jockey with the most Jockey Challenge Points at a race meeting and the winnings will be paid at the price taken.

== Jockey Challenge Points ==
Jockeys riding the first three placed horses* on their Scheduled Rides will earn Jockey Challenge Points as follows (Dead-heat situations excepted):

- 1st place: 12 points
- 2nd place: 6 points
- 3rd place: 4 points

Jockey Challenge Points scored by Substitute Jockeys# will not count. At the end of a race meeting, the jockey with the highest accumulated Jockey Challenge Points will be declared as the winner. The Jockey Challenge Points for all jockeys (including jockeys in No.14) will be counted on an individual basis.

- *No Jockey Challenge Points for the rest of the finishing positions.
- #A jockey who rides a Non-Scheduled Ride in a race

== About Hong Kong Jockey Challenge ==
The Hong Kong Jockey Club launched its own version of Jockey Challenge for the Hong Kong market on 20 April 2008.

Jockey Challenge was also available as an "inplay" bet type. This means that punters could place bets up to the halfway point of a race meeting, with the odds adjusted to reflect the winning chance of each individual selection throughout the day.
