= Avernes-sous-Exmes =

- Part of Gouffern en Auge
- Location of Avernes-sous-Exmes
- Location within France Location within Normandy
- Coordinates: 48°47′22″N 0°12′17″E
- Country: France
- Region: Normandy
- Department: Orne
- Arrondissement: Argentan
- Canton: Argentan-2
- Commune: Gouffern en Auge
- Area^{1}: 7.03 km^{2} (2.71 sq mi)
- Elevation: 270 m (890 ft)
- Highest elevation: 277 m (909 ft)
- Lowest elevation: 129 m (423 ft)
- Population (2023): 81
  - Density: 12/km^{2} (30/sq mi)
- Time zone: UTC+01:00 (CET)
  - Summer (DST): UTC+02:00 (CEST)
- Postal code: 61310
- ^{1} French Land Register data, which excludes lakes, ponds, glaciers > 1 km^{2} (0.386 sq mi or 247 acres) and river estuaries.

Avernes-sous-Exmes (French pronunciation: [avɛʁn su.z‿ɛm], literally Avernes under Exmes) is a former commune in the Orne department in northwestern France. On 1 January 2017, it was merged into the new commune Gouffern en Auge.

== Geography ==
Saint-Pierre-la-Rivière
Omméel, Villebadin	northwest	north	northeast	Ménil-Hubert-en-Exmes
Villebadin	west	self	east	Ménil-Hubert-en-Exmes, Courménil
Villebadin, Exmes	southwest	south	southeast	Courménil
Exmes, Courménil

== Toponymy ==
The name was originally Auvernes in C.1335 and Avernes in 1373. The commune was called this until 1830, where by decree, it became Avernes-sous-Exmes to distinguish it from the Avernes close to Vimoutiers which at the same time became Avernes-Saint-Gourgon.

According to Albert Dauzat, it may derive from the Gaulish areverno or a toponymic type similar to the Latin Averna, whereas René Lepelley identifies the Germanic afisna ("pasture") as the source, as with Avesnes; the 's' would have shifted to 'r' here, a phenomenon frequently observed in French phonetics. Old English contains the term æfesn("pasture"), derived from Common Germanic.

== History ==
The last lord was Jean-Jacques, count of Beausobre and marquis of Brisseuil, lord of Grébert, La Folie,Les Basses Londes etc. by special royal permission. He was born on the 15 March 1704, and was Marechal de Camp and lieutenant-general in the army. He retired and died at the Château de Brisseuil.

In 1821, in Avernes-sous-Exmes there were 252 inhabitants and in Grebert there were 120.

== Politics and Administration ==
Start	End	Name	Party	Profession
1919	after 1954	Robert Soret		
March 1965	June 1995	René Lorphelin		Farmer, Knight of the Order of Agricultural Merit (1972)
June 1995	March 2001	Pierre Besnard		Farmer
March 2001	March 2008	Marcel Pacory	Independent	Dairy controller
March 2008	December 2016	Claudine Poinsignon	Independent	

The municipal council consisted of seven members, including the mayor and two deputy mayors.

== Demographics ==
In 2023, the commune had 81 residents which was 1.25% from 2017. In 1841, Avernes-sous-Exmes had just 314 inhabitants and now it is the least populated commune in the Canton d'Exmes.

== Places and Monuments ==
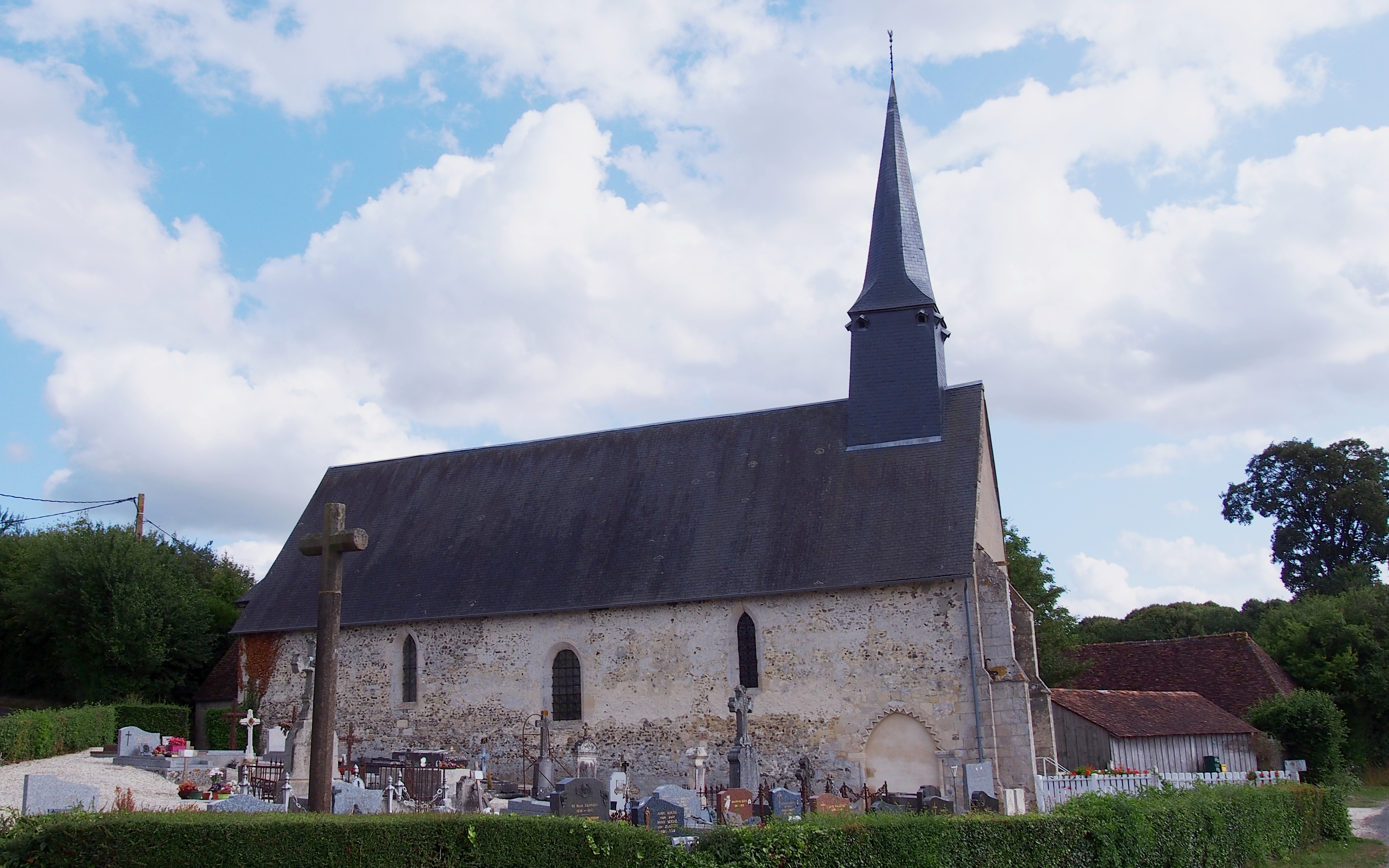
The church of Saint Leger in Avernes-sous-Exemes

- The church of Saint-Leger
- A seigneurial castle
- Ancien Manoir des Loges

== Notable people ==
- Louis-Stanislas de Colleville, a doctor and archaeologist from the area born at the Manior des Loges.
- Léon Bazalgette, a writer and journalist and the first biographer and translater of Walt Whitman and Henry David Thoreau.

== Heraldry ==
Description of the emblazon
Original French	De gueules à deux léopards d'or, l'un au-dessus de l'autre ; au pal d'hermine brochant
English blazon	Gules with two golden leopards one on top of another ; with vertical hermine
Notes	The two golden lions remind of the traditional coats of arms of Normandy.
Status	Official status but commune no longer exists.

== See also ==
- Communes of the Orne department
