= Edgar Chahine =

French painter

- Էդգար Շահին
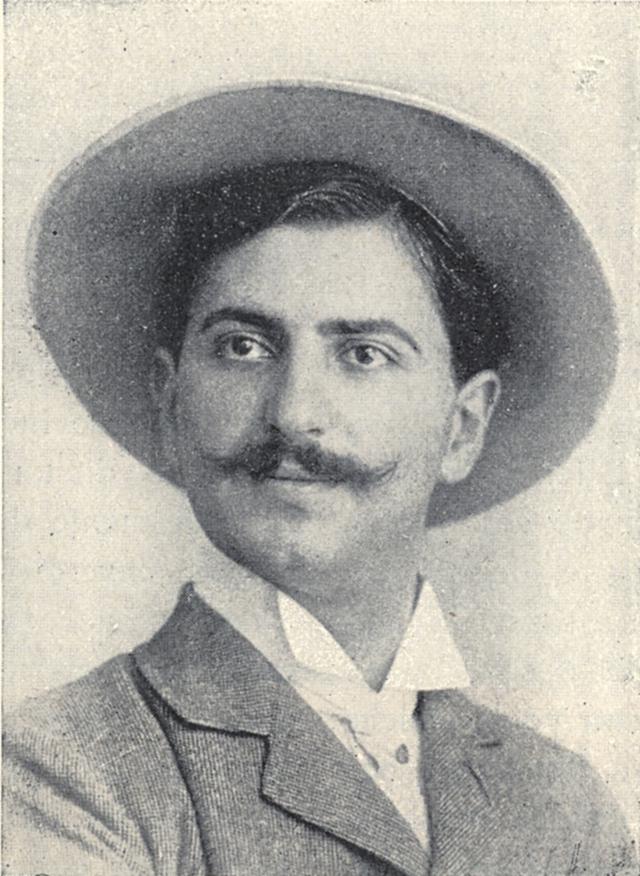
- Edgar Chahine (1905)
- Born: 31 October 1874; Vienna, Austria
- Died: 18 March 1947 (aged 72); Paris, France
- Education: Moorat-Raphael College
- Occupations: Illustrator, Painter, Engraver

Edgar Chahine (Armenian: Էդգար Պետրոսի Շահին: 31 October 1874 – 18 March 1947) was a French painter, engraver, and illustrator of Armenian descent.

== Biography ==
Edgar Chahine was born in Vienna but moved to Constantinople at a very young age. There he began his studies under the financial support of his father who was the director of the Ottoman Bank. His artistic abilities were soon noticed by his professor, Melkon Tiratzuyan, who advised him to pursue his studies in Italy in order to participate in a more active artistic environment. He then moved to Venice, where he attended the prestigious Armenian Moorat-Raphael College. He studied under Antonio Ermolao Paoletti at the renowned Academia di Belle Arti. After gaining much experience in Italy, he then moved to Paris in 1895. He enrolled at the Académie Julian, and had successful exhibitions at the Society of French Artists. His first painting to be exhibited at the Paris Salon“Société des artistes français ” was a portrait of a beggar. It was displayed in 1896. Chahine continued to have exhibitions at the Salon until 1899. In these exhibitions, Chahine included his art series called "Lamentable Life" which features the tables of poor people. In 1900, his prints earned him a gold medal at the Universal Exhibition in Paris. In 1903, he won another gold medal at the Venice Biennale. He became a naturalized French citizen in 1925 and was awarded the Légion d'Honneur in 1932. In 1926, many of Chahine's prints were destroyed in a fire. A flood in 1942 destroyed many more. Chahine died in Paris in 1947.

== Legacy ==
In 1928 a museum in Crouttes–Vimoutiers, the Musée Chahine, was named after him.
