= Avernes (disambiguation) =

Avernes may refer to:

- Avernes, a commune in the Val-d'Oise department in France
- Avernes (wasp), a wasp species in the family Encyrtidae
- Avernes-Saint-Gourgon, in the Orne department
- Avernes-sous-Exmes, in the Orne department

== See also ==
- Avermes
