= Château de Renouard =

Castle in Le Renouard, Orne, France

- Le Renouard, Orne, France

Site information
- Owner: Balliol family

Location
- Coordinates: 48.9099°N 0.1068°E

Château de Renouard is a castle in Le Renouard, Orne, France. It was a castle of the House of Balliol family. The castle was burned in 1119 but was rebuilt later. The castle now operates as a hotel.
