= Larrey =

Larrey may refer to:

- Larrey, Côte-d'Or, a commune of the Côte-d'Or département, France
- Dominique Jean Larrey (1766-1842), senior French surgeon in Napoleon's army
- Isaac de Larrey (1638/39 – 1719), French historian

== See also ==
- Larry (disambiguation)
