= Saint-Aubin-de-Bonneval =

- Commune
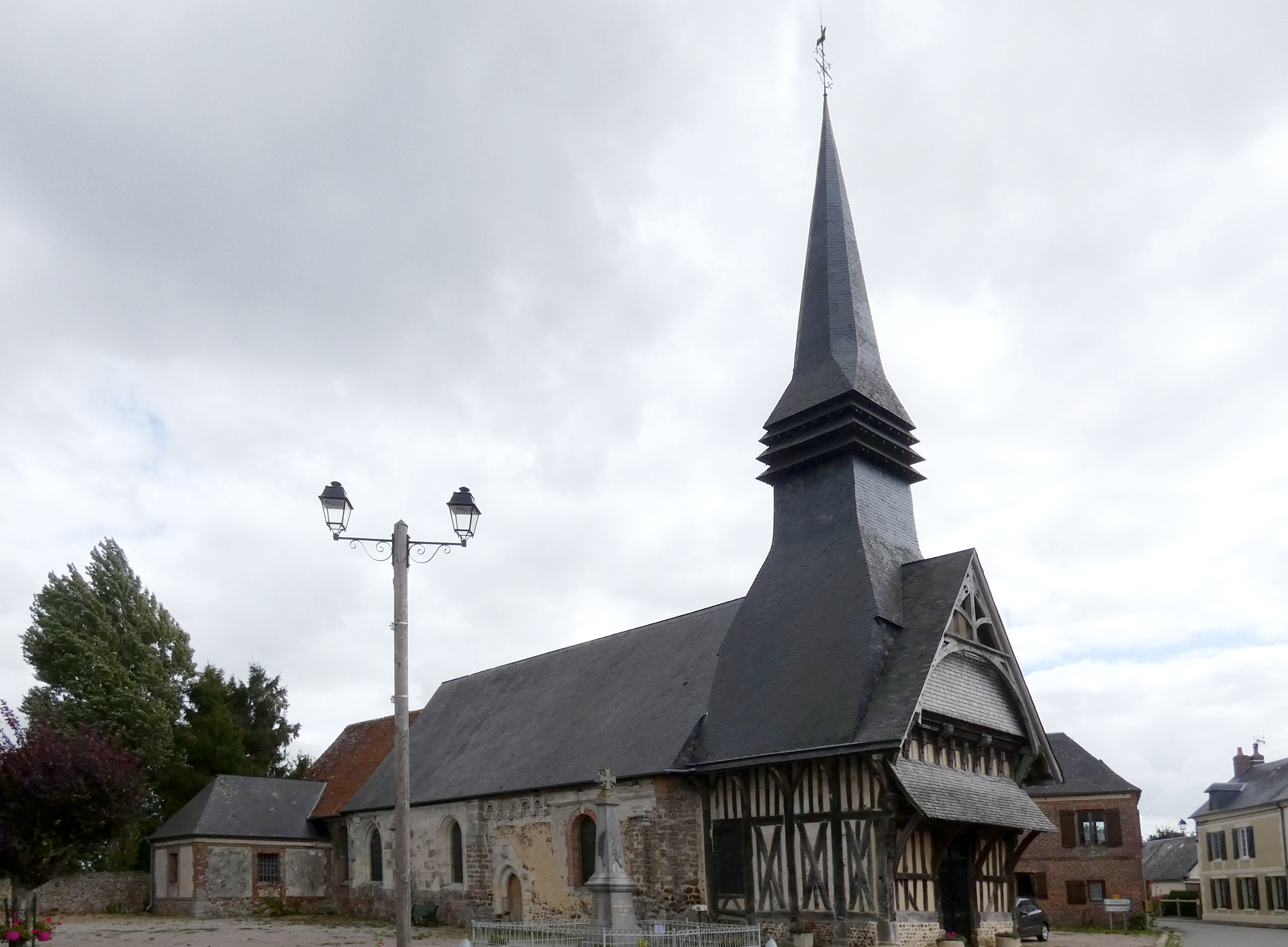
- Location of Saint-Aubin-de-Bonneval
- Location within France Location within Normandy
- Coordinates: 48°56′30″N 0°22′49″E
- Country: France
- Region: Normandy
- Department: Orne
- Arrondissement: Mortagne-au-Perche
- Canton: Vimoutiers

Government
  - Mayor (2020–2026): Pascale Stallegger
- Area^{1}: 11.67 km^{2} (4.51 sq mi)
- Elevation: 215 m (705 ft)
- Highest elevation: 234 m (768 ft)
- Lowest elevation: 153 m (502 ft)
- Population (2023): 131
  - Density: 11.2/km^{2} (29.1/sq mi)
- Time zone: UTC+01:00 (CET)
  - Summer (DST): UTC+02:00 (CEST)
- INSEE/Postal code: 61366 /61470
- ^{1} French Land Register data, which excludes lakes, ponds, glaciers > 1 km^{2} (0.386 sq mi or 247 acres) and river estuaries.

Saint-Aubin-de-Bonneval (French pronunciation: [sɛ̃.t‿obɛ̃ də bɔnval]) is a commune in the Orne department in north-western France.

== Geography ==
The commune is made up of the following collection of villages and hamlets, La Drouaire, Le Houlay, Saint-Aubin-de-Bonneval, Haras du Bos, Le Chesnay and La Renardière.

A stream, the Ruisseau de la Bigotiere flows through the commune.

== Points of interest ==
=== National heritage sites ===
- Saint-Aubin Church is a thirteenth century church, that was registered as a Monument historique 1991.

== See also ==
- Communes of the Orne department
