= Isaac de Larrey =

French historian

Isaac de Larrey, Sieur of Grandchamp and Courménil, born, according to some biographers 7 September 1638 in Lintot, near Bolbec and according to the majority, in Montivilliers, 25 January 1639 – 17 March 1719) was a French historian.

To freely exercise his religious beliefs because he was a Protestant, Larrey went into exile in Holland after the Edict of Fontainebleau. His historical work earned him the title of historiographer of the États Généraux. Shortly after, the ruler of Brandenbourg, by offering him the title of Aulic Council, attracted him to Berlin where he died.

== Publications ==
- Histoire d'Auguste, Rotterdam, 1690, in-12°.
- L'Héritière de Guyenne, ou Histoire d'Eléonore , 1691.
- Histoire d'Angleterre, d'Écosse et d'Irlande, 1707–1712, 4 vol. in-f°.
- Histoire des Sept sages de la Grèce, Fritsch et Bohm, Rotterdam, 1714. The first part contains le Banquet, and what happened at the table and at the court of Periander, tyrant, or King of Corinthe. Il y est question de Babylone, Carthage, Ceylan, Cyprus, Egypt and the Nile, Ethiopia, Marseille, etc.
- Geschiedenis van Engelandt, Schottlandt en Ierlandt … : met afbeeld. en landkaarten versiert, Amsterdam, Coven & Mortier, 1728.
- Histoire de France sous le règne de Louis XIV, 9 vol. in-12°, ou 3 vol. in-4°, Rotterdam, Michel Bohm & Compagnie, 1718-1722; 2nd ed. 1721–1733.
