= Le Bosc-Renoult =

- Commune
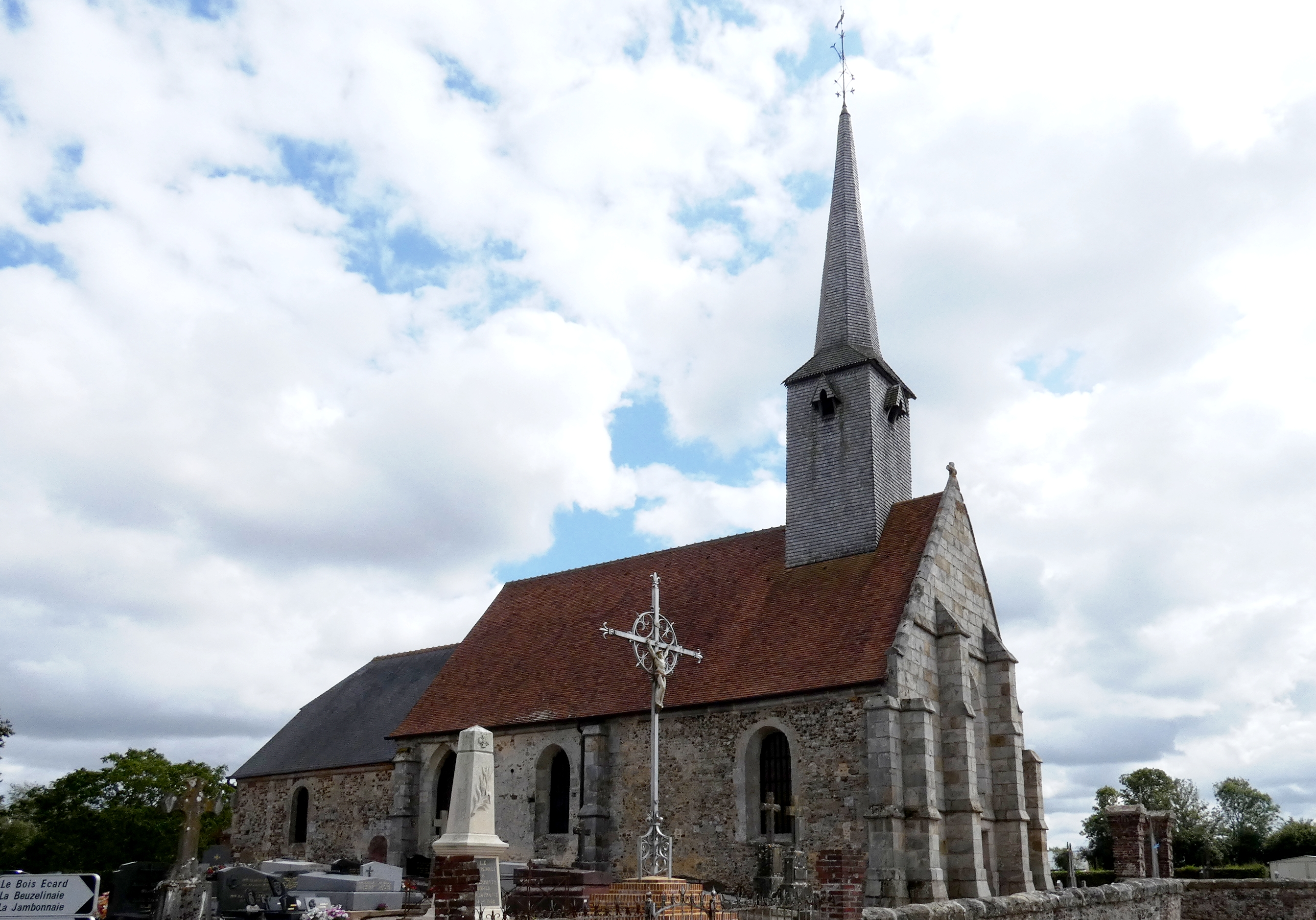
- Location of Le Bosc-Renoult
- Location within France Location within Normandy
- Coordinates: 48°54′51″N 0°18′22″E
- Country: France
- Region: Normandy
- Department: Orne
- Arrondissement: Mortagne-au-Perche
- Canton: Vimoutiers
- Intercommunality: Vallées d'Auge et du Merlerault

Government
  - Mayor (2020–2026): Nicole Brasseur
- Area^{1}: 12.70 km^{2} (4.90 sq mi)
- Elevation: 103 m (338 ft)
- Highest elevation: 242 m (794 ft)
- Lowest elevation: 165 m (541 ft)
- Population (2023): 262
  - Density: 20.6/km^{2} (53.4/sq mi)
- Time zone: UTC+01:00 (CET)
  - Summer (DST): UTC+02:00 (CEST)
- INSEE/Postal code: 61054 /61470
- ^{1} French Land Register data, which excludes lakes, ponds, glaciers > 1 km^{2} (0.386 sq mi or 247 acres) and river estuaries.

Le Bosc-Renoult is a commune in the Orne department in northwestern France.

== Geography ==
The commune is made up of the following collection of villages and hamlets, Le Bigot, La Futelaie, La Massaie and Le Bosc-Renoult.

A stream, the Ruisseau des Pres Garreaux, flows through the commune.

The commune along with another 11 communes shares part of a 1,400 hectare, Natura 2000 conservation area, called the Haute Vallée de la Touques et affluents.

== Population ==
Historical population
Year	Pop.	±% p.a.
1968	276	—
1975	243	−1.80%
1982	222	−1.28%
1990	212	−0.57%
1999	233	+1.05%
2007	232	−0.05%
2012	234	+0.17%
2017	249	+1.25%
2023	262	+0.85%
Source: INSEE

== See also ==
- Communes of the Orne department
