= Canapville, Orne =

Canapville
- Commune
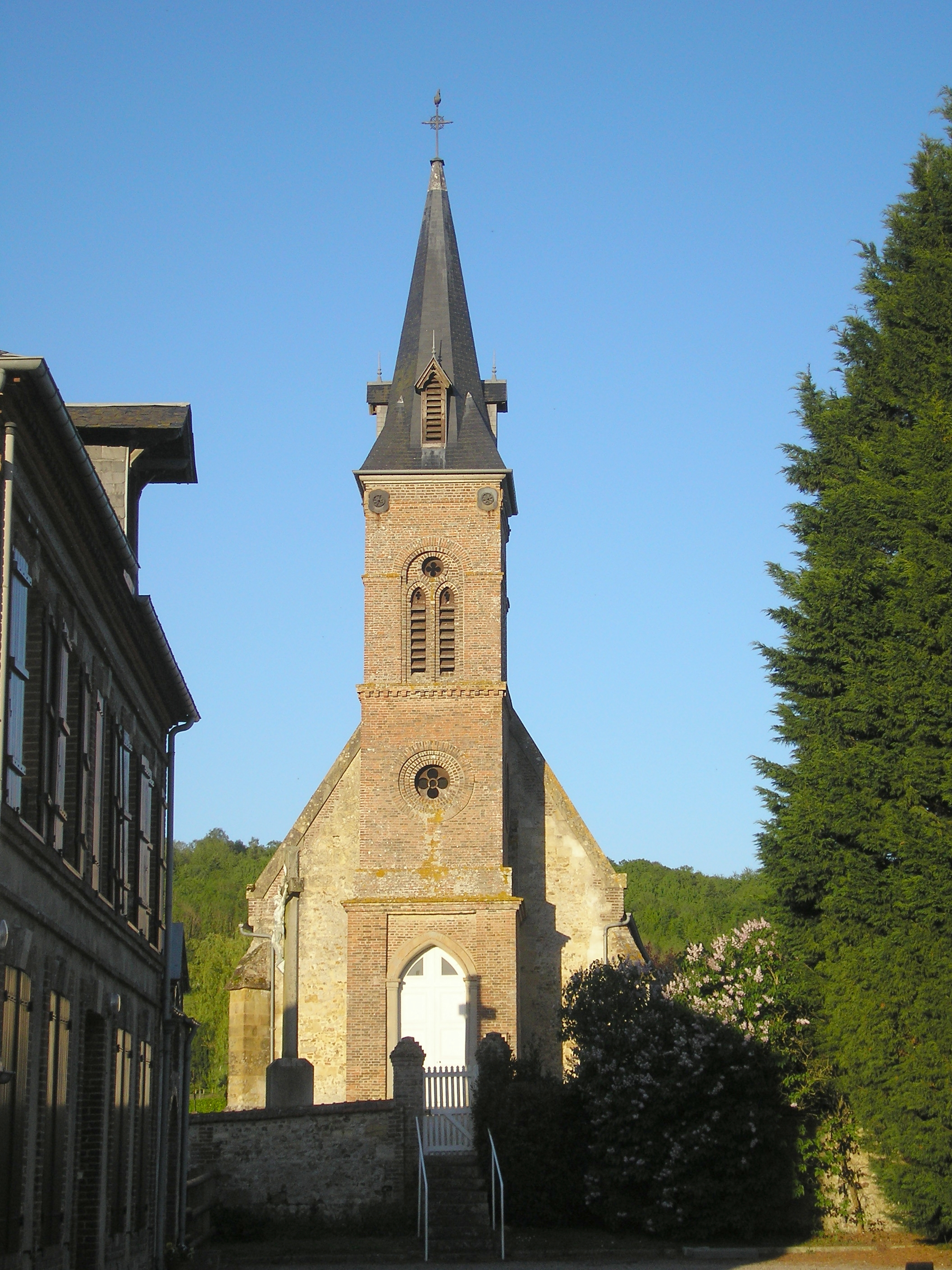
- The church in Canapville
- Location of Canapville
- Location within France Location within Normandy
- Coordinates: 48°56′52″N 0°16′15″E
- Country: France
- Region: Normandy
- Department: Orne
- Arrondissement: Mortagne-au-Perche
- Canton: Vimoutiers

Government
  - Mayor (2020–2026): Marie France Tabard
- Area^{1}: 8.22 km^{2} (3.17 sq mi)
- Elevation: 127 m (417 ft)
- Highest elevation: 222 m (728 ft)
- Lowest elevation: 110 m (360 ft)
- Population (2023): 226
  - Density: 27.5/km^{2} (71.2/sq mi)
- Time zone: UTC+01:00 (CET)
  - Summer (DST): UTC+02:00 (CEST)
- INSEE/Postal code: 61072 /61120
- ^{1} French Land Register data, which excludes lakes, ponds, glaciers > 1 km^{2} (0.386 sq mi or 247 acres) and river estuaries.

Canapville (French pronunciation: [kanapvil]) is a commune in the Orne department in north-western France.

== Geography ==
The commune is made up of the following collection of villages and hamlets, Le Bourg, Canapville, Beaulevêque and La Roussière.

The commune along with another 11 communes shares part of a 1,400 hectare, Natura 2000 conservation area, called the Haute Vallée de la Touques et affluents.

The Touques river flows through the commune in addition to a stream, the Ruisseau de Beauleveque.

== Points of Interest ==
- Prairie humide de Canapville-Roger Brun is a nature reserve created in 1982 and named after a local naturalist who is now deceased. The reserve features a rare plant to Normandy the Aconitum napellus.
- Coteau de la Cour Cucu is a Sensitive Natural Space of Orne, 2 hectares in size. Its flagship species of protection are Neotinea ustulata, Dactylorhiza viridis and the Marsh fritillary.

== See also ==
- Communes of the Orne department
