= Neuville-sur-Touques =

- Commune
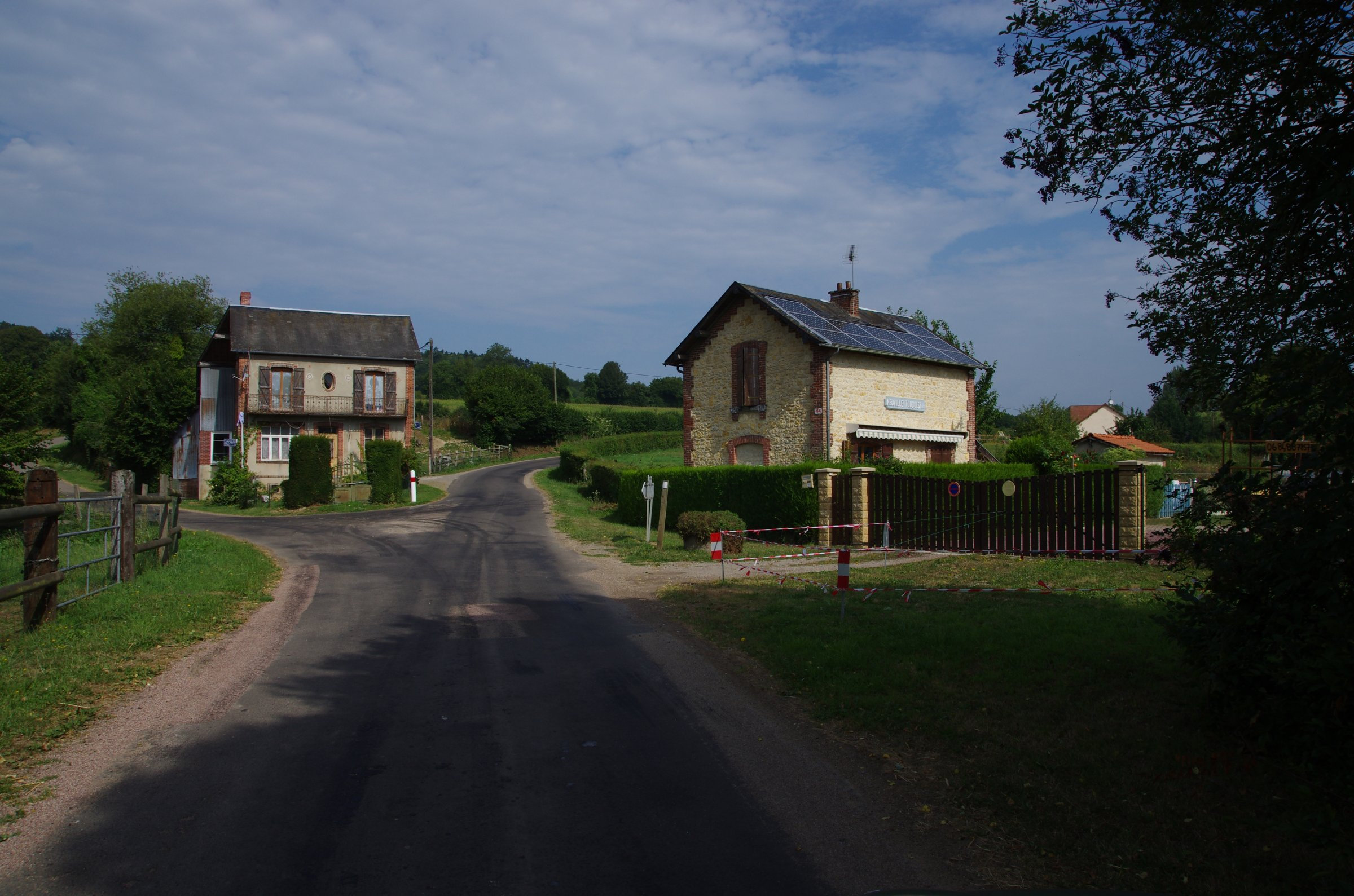
- The former railway station in Neuville-sur-Touques
- Location of Neuville-sur-Touques
- Location within France Location within Normandy
- Coordinates: 48°51′31″N 0°17′05″E
- Country: France
- Region: Normandy
- Department: Orne
- Arrondissement: Mortagne-au-Perche
- Canton: Vimoutiers
- Intercommunality: Vallées d'Auge et du Merlerault

Government
  - Mayor (2020–2026): Sylvie Bonetta
- Area^{1}: 15.35 km^{2} (5.93 sq mi)
- Elevation: 155 m (509 ft)
- Highest elevation: 266 m (873 ft)
- Lowest elevation: 146 m (479 ft)
- Population (2023): 229
  - Density: 14.9/km^{2} (38.6/sq mi)
- Time zone: UTC+01:00 (CET)
  - Summer (DST): UTC+02:00 (CEST)
- INSEE/Postal code: 61307 /61120
- ^{1} French Land Register data, which excludes lakes, ponds, glaciers > 1 km^{2} (0.386 sq mi or 247 acres) and river estuaries.

Neuville-sur-Touques (French pronunciation: [nøvil syʁ tuk], literally Neuville on Touques) is a commune in the Orne department in north-western France.

== Geography ==
The commune is made up of the following collection of villages and hamlets, La Cotillière and Neuville-sur-Touques.

The commune has the Touques flowing through its borders, plus three other streams, The Chaumont, The Tanneries and The Douy.

== See also ==
- Communes of the Orne department
