= La Fresnaie-Fayel =

- Commune
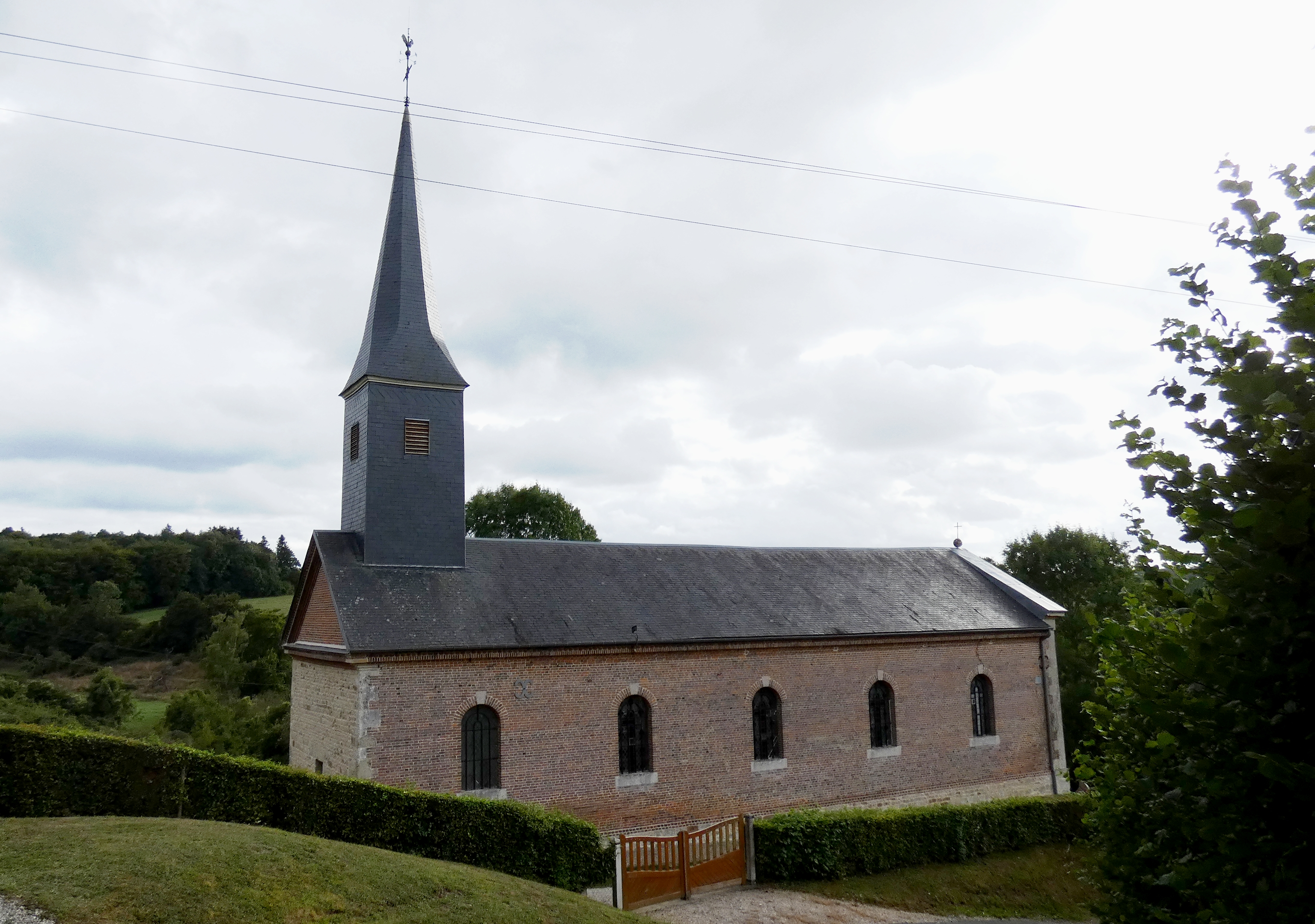
- Location of La Fresnaie-Fayel
- Location within France Location within Normandy
- Coordinates: 48°49′46″N 0°13′27″E
- Country: France
- Region: Normandy
- Department: Orne
- Arrondissement: Mortagne-au-Perche
- Canton: Vimoutiers
- Intercommunality: Vallées d'Auge et du Merlerault

Government
  - Mayor (2020–2026): Philippe Ferey
- Area^{1}: 5.09 km^{2} (1.97 sq mi)
- Elevation: 250 m (820 ft)
- Highest elevation: 269 m (883 ft)
- Lowest elevation: 150 m (490 ft)
- Population (2023): 50
  - Density: 9.8/km^{2} (25/sq mi)
- Time zone: UTC+01:00 (CET)
  - Summer (DST): UTC+02:00 (CEST)
- INSEE/Postal code: 61178 /61230
- ^{1} French Land Register data, which excludes lakes, ponds, glaciers > 1 km^{2} (0.386 sq mi or 247 acres) and river estuaries.

La Fresnaie-Fayel (French pronunciation: [la fʁɛnɛ fajɛl]) is a commune in the Orne department in north-western France.

== Geography ==
The commune is made up of the following collection of villages and hamlets, Le Coudray and La Fresnaie-Fayel.

The commune has one watercourse, the Val Roger stream running through its borders.

== See also ==
- Communes of the Orne department
