= Camembert, Orne =

Camembert
- Commune
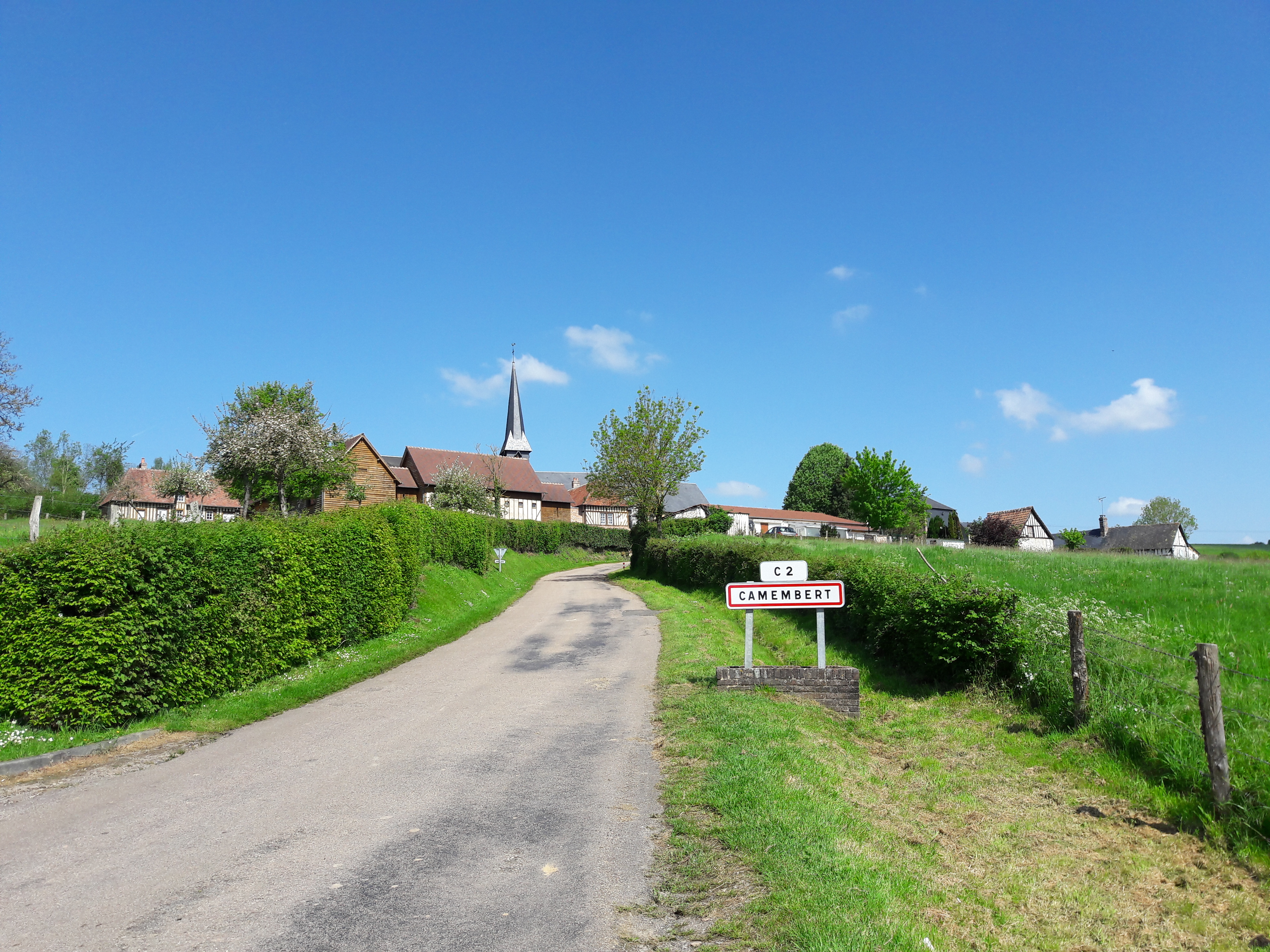
- The road into Camembert
- Location of Camembert
- Location within France Location within Normandy
- Coordinates: 48°53′38″N 0°10′42″E
- Country: France
- Region: Normandy
- Department: Orne
- Arrondissement: Mortagne-au-Perche
- Canton: Vimoutiers
- Area^{1}: 10.3 km^{2} (4.0 sq mi)
- Elevation: 137 m (449 ft)
- Highest elevation: 237 m (778 ft)
- Lowest elevation: 111 m (364 ft)
- Population (2023): 168
  - Density: 16.3/km^{2} (42.2/sq mi)
- Time zone: UTC+01:00 (CET)
  - Summer (DST): UTC+02:00 (CEST)
- INSEE/Postal code: 61071 /61120
- ^{1} French Land Register data, which excludes lakes, ponds, glaciers > 1 km^{2} (0.386 sq mi or 247 acres) and river estuaries.

Camembert (French pronunciation: [kamɑ̃bɛʁ]) is a commune in the Orne department in north-western France.

It is the place where camembert cheese originated and is named after.

== Geography ==
The commune is part of the area known as Pays d'Auge.

One river, the Viette, and three streams (the Besion, the Moulin Neuf, and the Costillets) run through the commune.

== History ==
The village is most noted for the early development of camembert cheese by Marie Harel in 1791.

== Notable buildings and places ==
- Maison Du Camembert a museum telling how the story of the history of the cheese and how it is produced. The museum is in the shape of a Camembert cheese.
- Beamoncel the manor house, which was the home of Marie Harel.
- President Farm another museum about camembert that is linked to the dairy brand, Président.
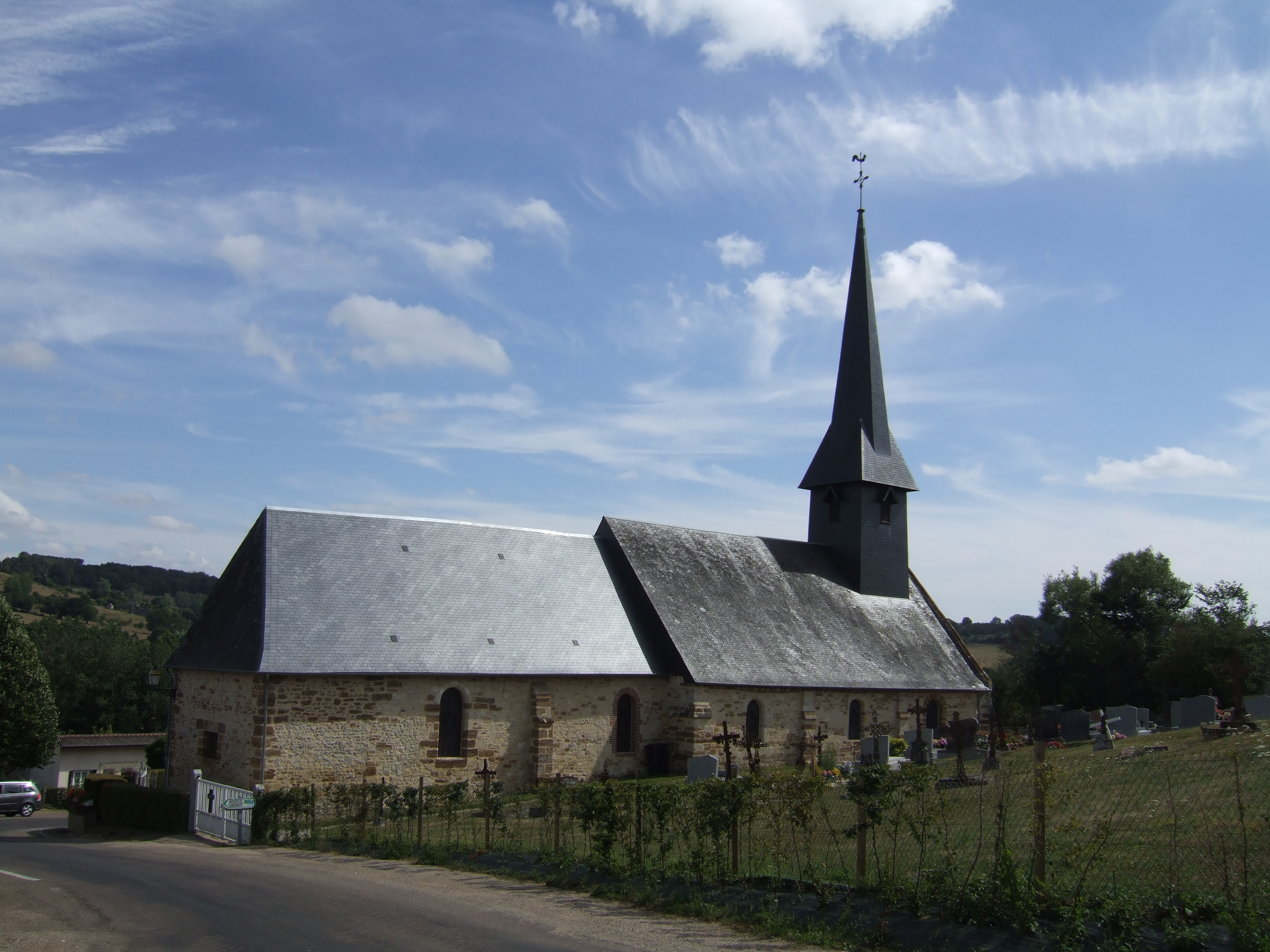
Camembert church

== Population ==
Historical population
| Year | Pop. | ±% p.a. |
|---|---|---|
| 1968 | 197 | — |
| 1975 | 176 | −1.60% |
| 1982 | 177 | +0.08% |
| 1990 | 184 | +0.49% |
| 1999 | 197 | +0.76% |
| 2007 | 217 | +1.22% |
| 2012 | 196 | −2.02% |
| 2017 | 187 | −0.94% |
| 2023 | 168 | −1.77% |
Source: INSEE

== Notable associations ==
- Marie Harel (1761–1844) was the inventor of Camembert cheese, lived and worked in the village.
- Lutteur B, a horse from the Foucaudière farm in Camembert in 1955 that was ridden by Pierre Jonquères d'Oriola in the 1964 Summer Olympics, winning a Gold and Silver medal

== See also ==
- Communes of the Orne department
