= Louis Tillaye =

French politician (1847–1913)

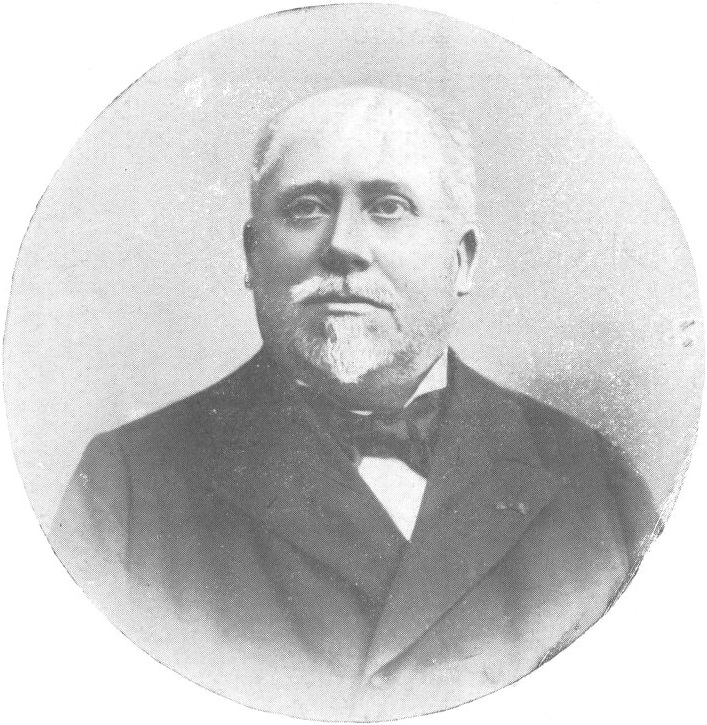

Member of the Senate of the Third French Republic
- In office 1895–1913
- Constituency: Calvados

Personal details
- Born: 31 May 1847 Vimoutiers, France
- Died: 7 May 1913 (aged 65) Pau, France

Louis Charles Tillaye (31 May 1847 – 7 May 1913) was a French politician of the Third French Republic. He was Minister of Public works (28 June – 17 September 1898) in the government of Henri Brisson. He was also a senator for Calvados from 1895 to 1913.

== Sources ==
- "Louis Tillaye", in Adolphe Robert and Gaston Cougny, Dictionnaire des parlementaires français (1789–1891), Bourloton, Paris, 1889 Edition details Wikisource
