= Champosoult =

- Commune
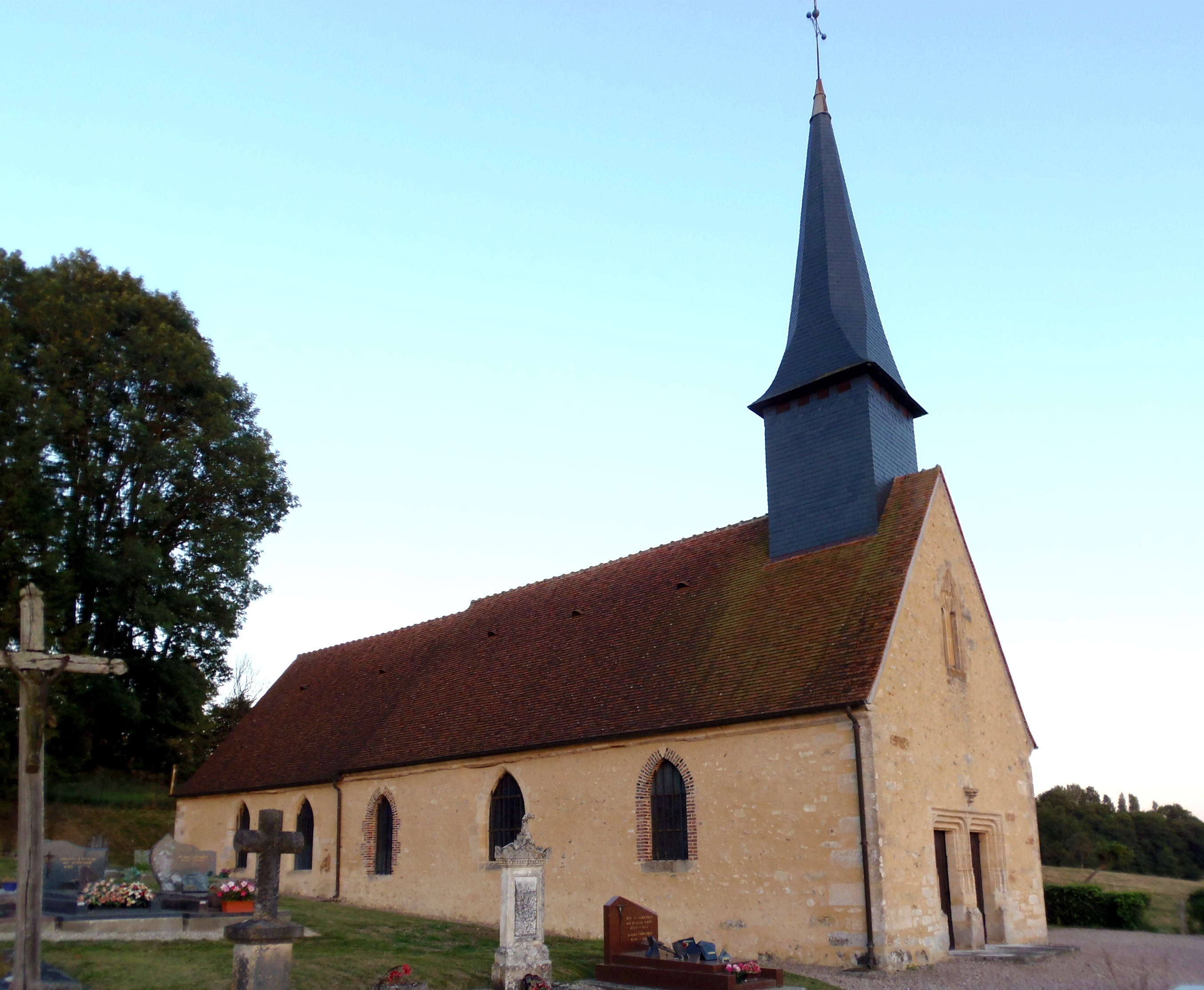
- The church in Champosoult
- Location of Champosoult
- Location within France Location within Normandy
- Coordinates: 48°52′16″N 0°10′18″E
- Country: France
- Region: Normandy
- Department: Orne
- Arrondissement: Mortagne-au-Perche
- Canton: Vimoutiers
- Intercommunality: Vallées d'Auge et du Merlerault

Government
  - Mayor (2020–2026): Bernard Chrétien
- Area^{1}: 7.01 km^{2} (2.71 sq mi)
- Elevation: 215 m (705 ft)
- Highest elevation: 259 m (850 ft)
- Lowest elevation: 140 m (460 ft)
- Population (2023): 105
  - Density: 15.0/km^{2} (38.8/sq mi)
- Demonym: Champosulfiens
- Time zone: UTC+01:00 (CET)
  - Summer (DST): UTC+02:00 (CEST)
- INSEE/Postal code: 61089 /61120
- ^{1} French Land Register data, which excludes lakes, ponds, glaciers > 1 km^{2} (0.386 sq mi or 247 acres) and river estuaries.

Champosoult (French pronunciation: [ʃɑ̃pozu]) is a commune in the Orne department in north-western France.

== Geography ==
The commune has two streams running through its borders, the Costillets and the Besion.

== See also ==
- Communes of the Orne department
