= Saint-Germain-d'Aunay =

- Commune
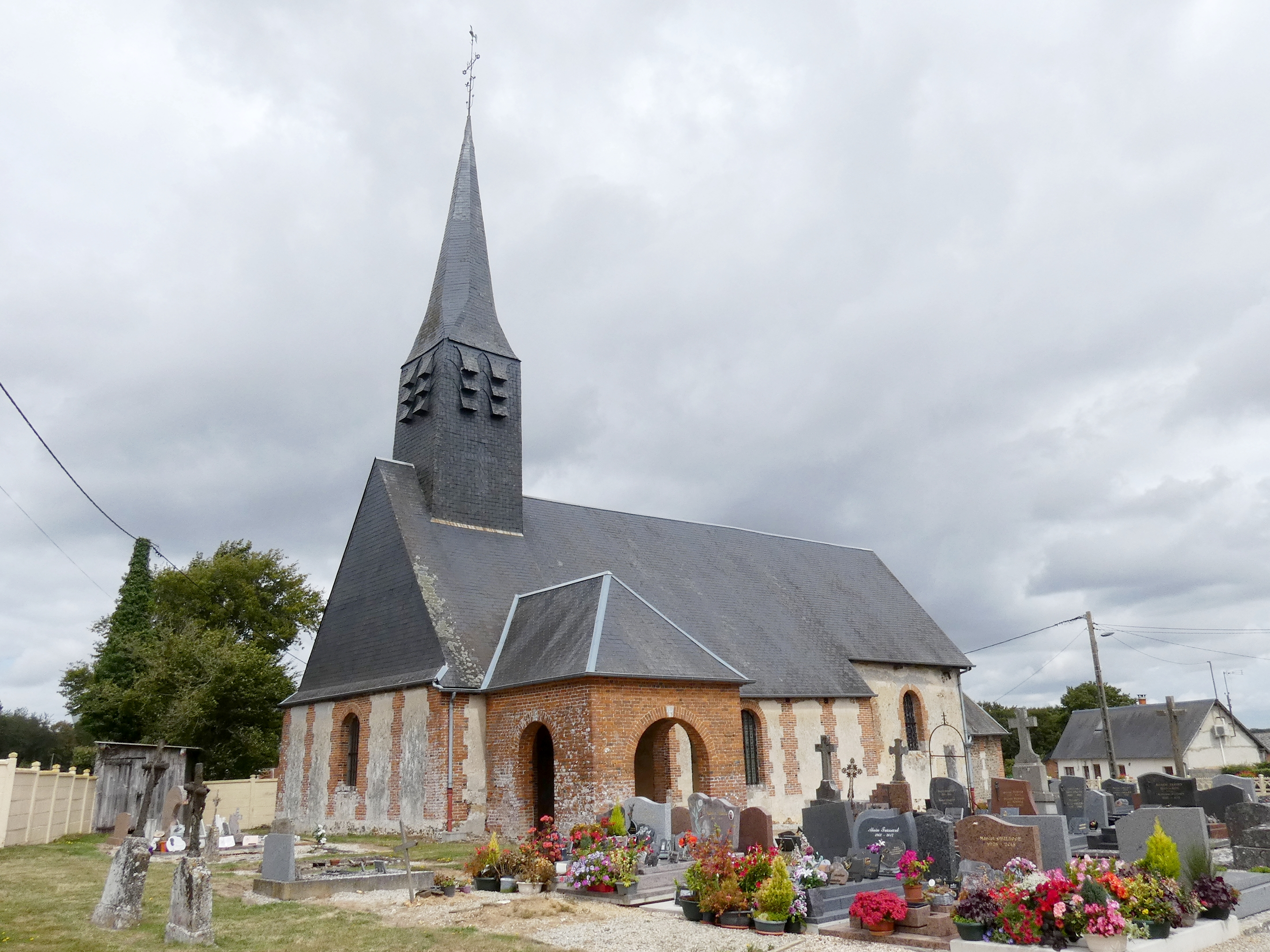
- Location of Saint-Germain-d'Aunay
- Location within France Location within Normandy
- Coordinates: 48°55′34″N 0°22′49″E
- Country: France
- Region: Normandy
- Department: Orne
- Arrondissement: Mortagne-au-Perche
- Canton: Vimoutiers
- Intercommunality: Vallées d'Auge et du Merlerault

Government
  - Mayor (2020–2026): Louis Toque
- Area^{1}: 8.51 km^{2} (3.29 sq mi)
- Elevation: 221 m (725 ft)
- Highest elevation: 233 m (764 ft)
- Lowest elevation: 164 m (538 ft)
- Population (2023): 116
  - Density: 13.6/km^{2} (35.3/sq mi)
- Time zone: UTC+01:00 (CET)
  - Summer (DST): UTC+02:00 (CEST)
- INSEE/Postal code: 61392 /61470
- ^{1} French Land Register data, which excludes lakes, ponds, glaciers > 1 km^{2} (0.386 sq mi or 247 acres) and river estuaries.

Saint-Germain-d'Aunay (French pronunciation: [sɛ̃ ʒɛʁmɛ̃ donɛ]) is a commune in the Orne department in the Normandy region of France with a population of 144 inhabitants (2018).

== History ==
A manor was built at the end of the 15th century by Guillaume de Mallevouë, knight and lord of the manors of Saint-Germain and Notre-Dame-d'Aulnay. All that is left is the lodge and a bartizan. The majority of the manor was destroyed by the French Catholic League in 1589 and was replaced by a half-timbered building.

In 1822, Saint-Germain-d'Aunay (377 inhabitants in 1821) absorbed Notre-Dame-d'Aunay (123 inhabitants), further to its south. Both villages are shown on the Cassini map of the area.

== Geography ==
A stream, the Ruisseau de la Bigotiere flows through the commune.

== Points of interest ==
=== National heritage sites ===
- Manor in Saint-Germain-d’Aunay a sixteenth century Manor house, that was restored by Victor Ruprich-Robert, it was registered as a Monument historique in 1992. The Manor house was where Henri Breuil wrote most of his work on prehistory in the early 1900s.

== See also ==
- Communes of the Orne department
