= Roiville =

- Commune
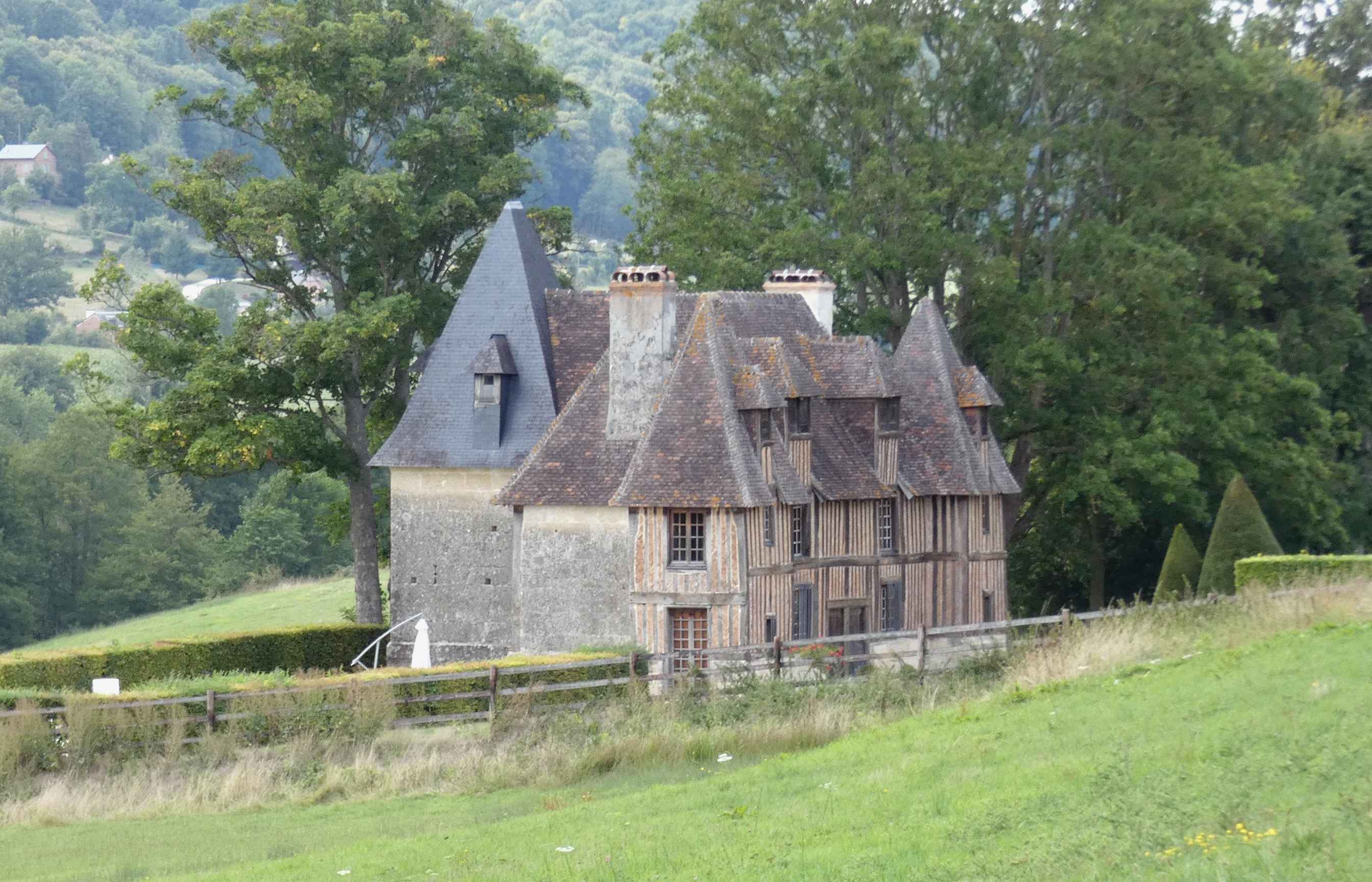
- Location of Roiville
- Location within France Location within Normandy
- Coordinates: 48°52′51″N 0°14′09″E
- Country: France
- Region: Normandy
- Department: Orne
- Arrondissement: Mortagne-au-Perche
- Canton: Vimoutiers
- Intercommunality: Vallées d'Auge et du Merlerault

Government
  - Mayor (2020–2026): Yvette Férey
- Area^{1}: 8.18 km^{2} (3.16 sq mi)
- Elevation: 180 m (590 ft)
- Highest elevation: 245 m (804 ft)
- Lowest elevation: 118 m (387 ft)
- Population (2023): 133
  - Density: 16.3/km^{2} (42.1/sq mi)
- Time zone: UTC+01:00 (CET)
  - Summer (DST): UTC+02:00 (CEST)
- INSEE/Postal code: 61351 /61120
- ^{1} French Land Register data, which excludes lakes, ponds, glaciers > 1 km^{2} (0.386 sq mi or 247 acres) and river estuaries.

Roiville (French pronunciation: [ʁwavil]) is a commune in the Orne department in north-western France.

== Geography ==
The commune along with another 11 communes shares part of a 1,400 hectare, Natura 2000 conservation area, called the Haute Vallée de la Touques et affluents.

The River Vie runs through the commune in addition to a stream, the Valame.

== Notable buildings and places ==
=== National heritage sites ===
Manor of Mesnil is a 16th century Manor house, classified as a Monument historique in 1981.

== See also ==
- Communes of the Orne department
