= Mardilly =

- Commune
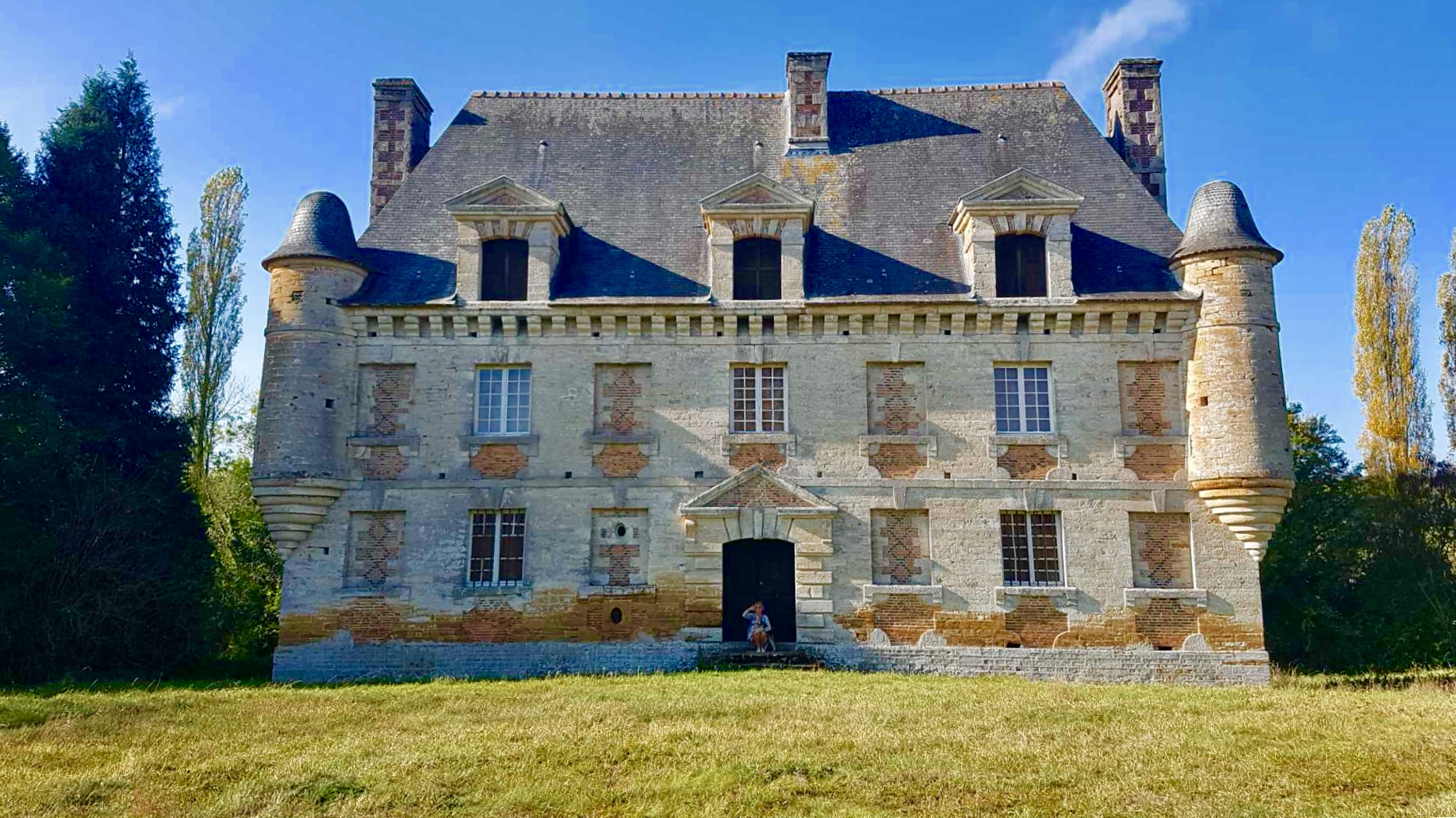
- La Bouverie Manor in Mardilly
- Location of Mardilly
- Location within France Location within Normandy
- Coordinates: 48°49′57″N 0°16′48″E
- Country: France
- Region: Normandy
- Department: Orne
- Arrondissement: Mortagne-au-Perche
- Canton: Vimoutiers
- Intercommunality: Vallées d'Auge et du Merlerault

Government
  - Mayor (2020–2026): Alain Gourio
- Area^{1}: 12.76 km^{2} (4.93 sq mi)
- Elevation: 250 m (820 ft)
- Highest elevation: 286 m (938 ft)
- Lowest elevation: 160 m (520 ft)
- Population (2023): 131
  - Density: 10.3/km^{2} (26.6/sq mi)
- Time zone: UTC+01:00 (CET)
  - Summer (DST): UTC+02:00 (CEST)
- INSEE/Postal code: 61252 /61230
- ^{1} French Land Register data, which excludes lakes, ponds, glaciers > 1 km^{2} (0.386 sq mi or 247 acres) and river estuaries.

Mardilly (French pronunciation: [maʁdiji]) is a commune in the Orne department in north-western France.

== Geography ==
The commune has one river, The Touques and two streams, the Chaumont and the Douy running through its borders.

== Notable buildings and places ==
=== National heritage sites ===
Manoir de la Bouverie a 17th-century Manor house, which was classified as a Monument historique in 1968.

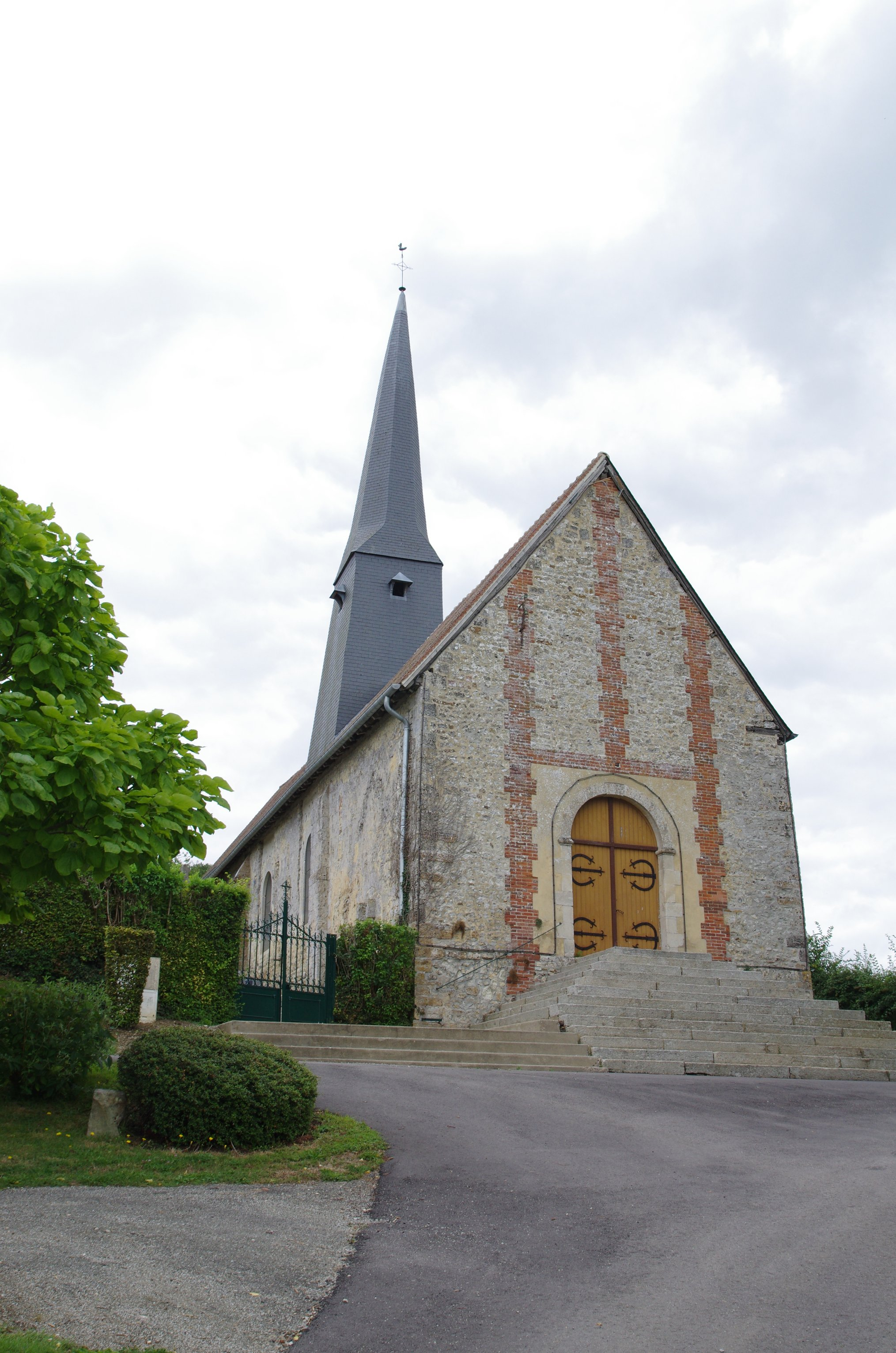
Mardilly church

== See also ==
- Communes of the Orne department
