= Le Sap-André =

- Commune
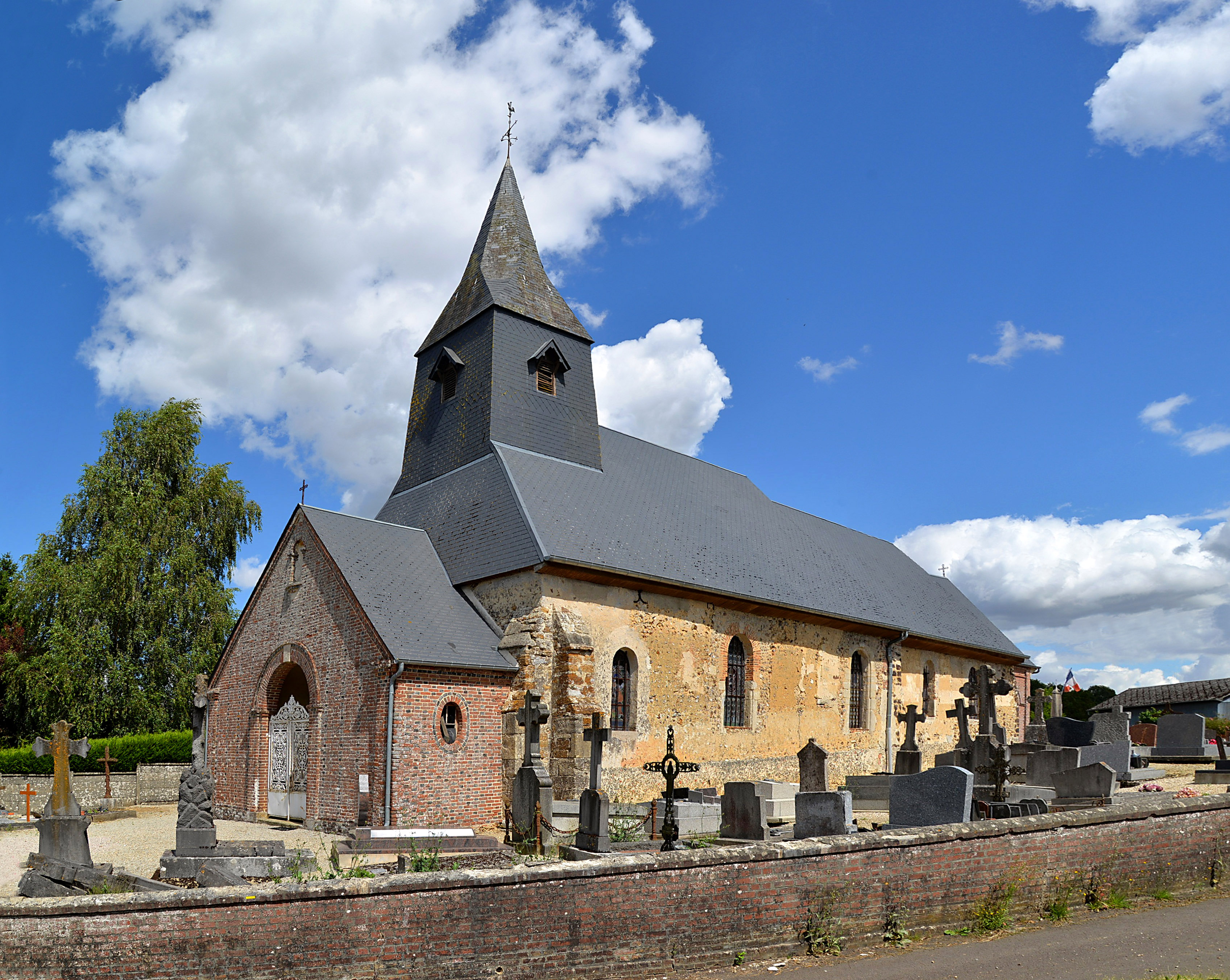
- The church in Le Sap-André
- Location of Le Sap-André
- Location within France Location within Normandy
- Coordinates: 48°49′56″N 0°22′53″E
- Country: France
- Region: Normandy
- Department: Orne
- Arrondissement: Mortagne-au-Perche
- Canton: Vimoutiers
- Intercommunality: Vallées d'Auge et du Merlerault

Government
  - Mayor (2020–2026): Alain Lamperière
- Area^{1}: 9.53 km^{2} (3.68 sq mi)
- Elevation: 280 m (920 ft)
- Highest elevation: 297 m (974 ft)
- Lowest elevation: 222 m (728 ft)
- Population (2023): 125
  - Density: 13.1/km^{2} (34.0/sq mi)
- Time zone: UTC+01:00 (CET)
  - Summer (DST): UTC+02:00 (CEST)
- INSEE/Postal code: 61461 /61230
- ^{1} French Land Register data, which excludes lakes, ponds, glaciers > 1 km^{2} (0.386 sq mi or 247 acres) and river estuaries.

Le Sap-André (French pronunciation: [lə sap ɑ̃dʁe]) is a commune in the Orne department in north-western France.

== Geography ==
The commune, along with another 69 communes, shares part of a 4,747 hectare, Natura 2000 conservation area, called Risle, Guiel, Charentonne.

A river La Guiel passes through the commune.

== Transport ==
Aire de Service Les Haras is a service station on the A28 autoroute that also crosses into the neighbouring commune of Chaumont.

== See also ==
- Communes of the Orne department
