= Léon Bazalgette =

- Born: May 8, 1873; Paris
- Died: December 31, 1928 (aged 55); Paris
- Resting place: Avernes-sous-Exmes
- Known for: literary critic, biographer and translator
- Partner: Augustine Perrin

Maurice Léon Bazalgette (8 May 1873 – 31 December 1928) was a French literary critic, biographer and translator. His translations of the works of Walt Whitman introduced Whitman to the French public.

== Biography ==
In 1905, through Émile Verhaeren, he became acquainted with Stefan Zweig. Zweig recounts their friendship in his memoir, The World of Yesterday.

In 1908, he published a biography of Walt Whitman, "Whitman, the man and the work". In 1909, he published a translation of Leaves of Grass. In 1924 he published a biography of Henry David Thoreau, Henry Thoreau, Sauvage.

Bazalgette frequented the Abbaye de Créteil, a community of artists founded by Georges Duhamel and Charles Vildrac. He wrote for Clarté, La Vie Ouvrière, and from 1926 to 1928 he had a column in communist newspaper L'Humanité.

He is buried in the cemetery of Avernes-sous-Exmes, Orne, where he owned a country house, the Moulin des Noës.
