= Guerquesalles =

- Commune
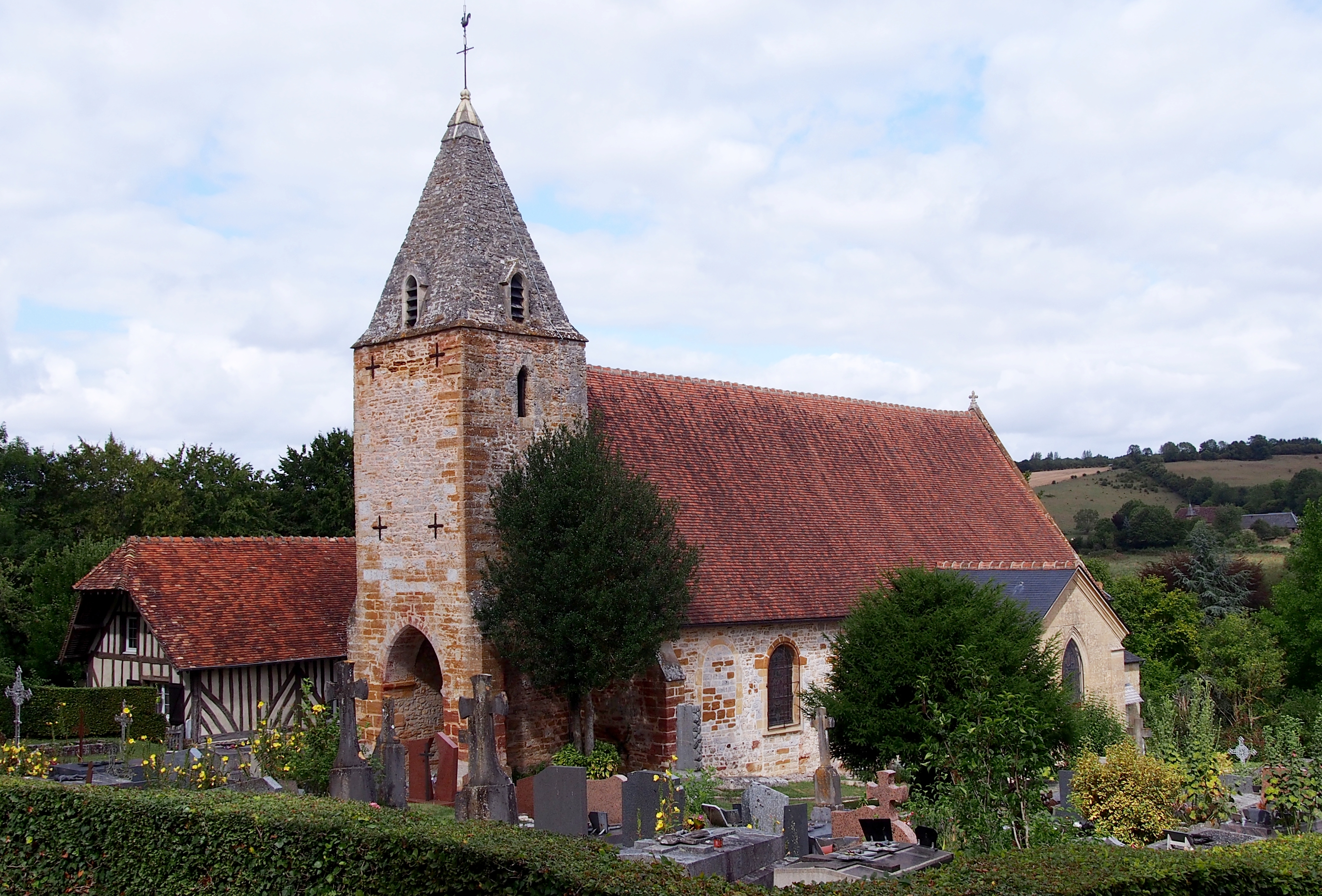
- Guerquesalles, Saint Germain Church.
- Location of Guerquesalles
- Location within France Location within Normandy
- Coordinates: 48°54′26″N 0°12′29″E
- Country: France
- Region: Normandy
- Department: Orne
- Arrondissement: Mortagne-au-Perche
- Canton: Vimoutiers
- Intercommunality: Vallées d'Auge et du Merlerault

Government
  - Mayor (2020–2026): Agnès Laigre
- Area^{1}: 8.66 km^{2} (3.34 sq mi)
- Elevation: 180 m (590 ft)
- Highest elevation: 229 m (751 ft)
- Lowest elevation: 104 m (341 ft)
- Population (2023): 122
  - Density: 14.1/km^{2} (36.5/sq mi)
- Time zone: UTC+01:00 (CET)
  - Summer (DST): UTC+02:00 (CEST)
- INSEE/Postal code: 61198 /61120
- ^{1} French Land Register data, which excludes lakes, ponds, glaciers > 1 km^{2} (0.386 sq mi or 247 acres) and river estuaries.

Guerquesalles (French pronunciation: [ɡɛʁkəsal]) is a commune in the Orne department in north-western France.

== Geography ==
The commune is made up of the following collection of villages and hamlets, Malvoue and Guerquesalles.

The commune has two rivers running through it the Vie & the Viette in addition to four streams, the Fontaine de la Motte, the Fontaine de la Roche, the Moulin Neuf, plus the Valame.

== Notable buildings and places ==
  - Coteau du Champ-du-Noyer is a 1.36 hectare site is a protected area created in 2019 as part of the Natura 2000 initiative.

=== National heritage sites ===
- Cocardière Manor is a 16th-century manor house, classified as a Monument historique in 1929.

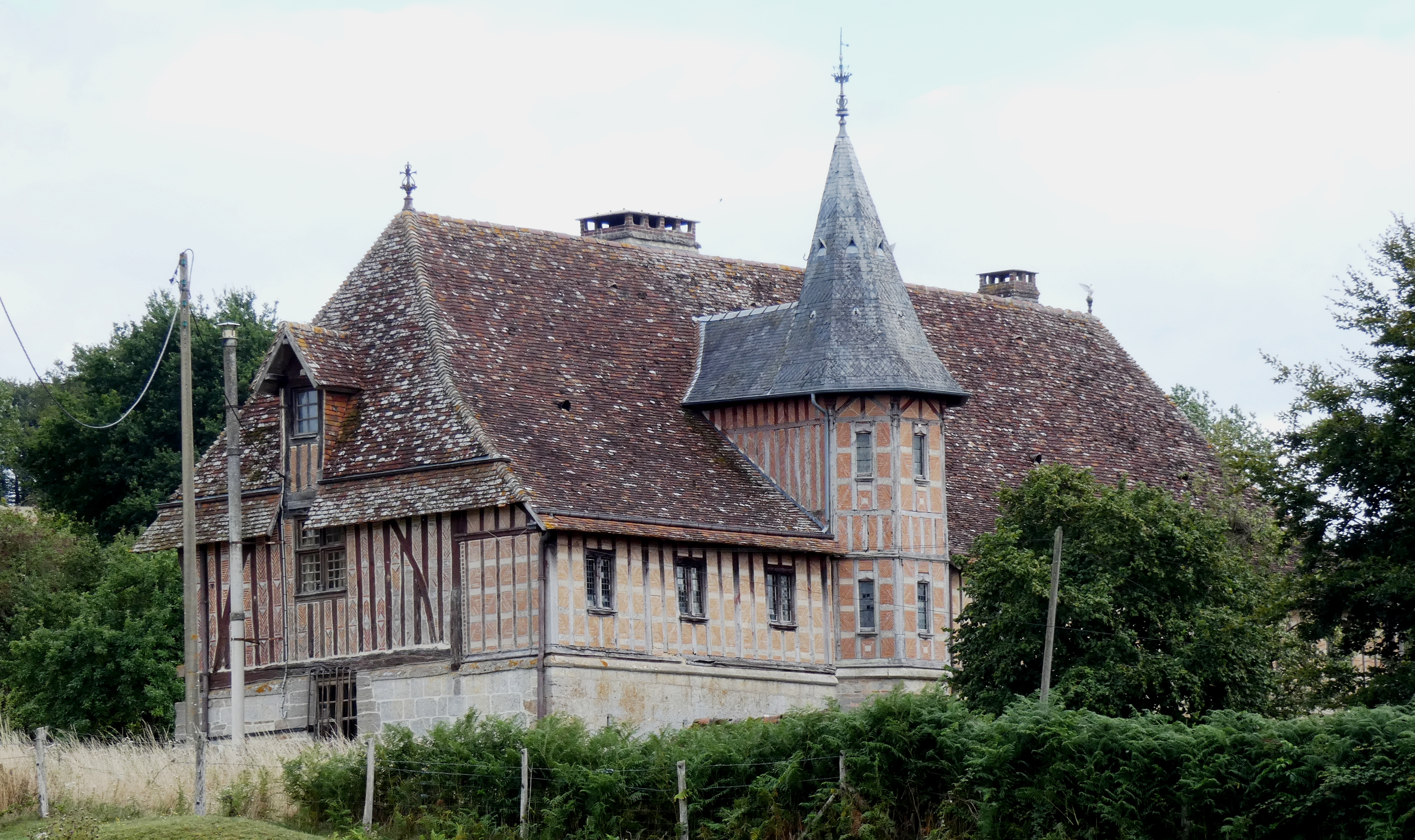
Manoir De La Cocardiere

== See also ==
- Communes of the Orne department
