= Marie Harel =

French cheesemaker (1761–1844)

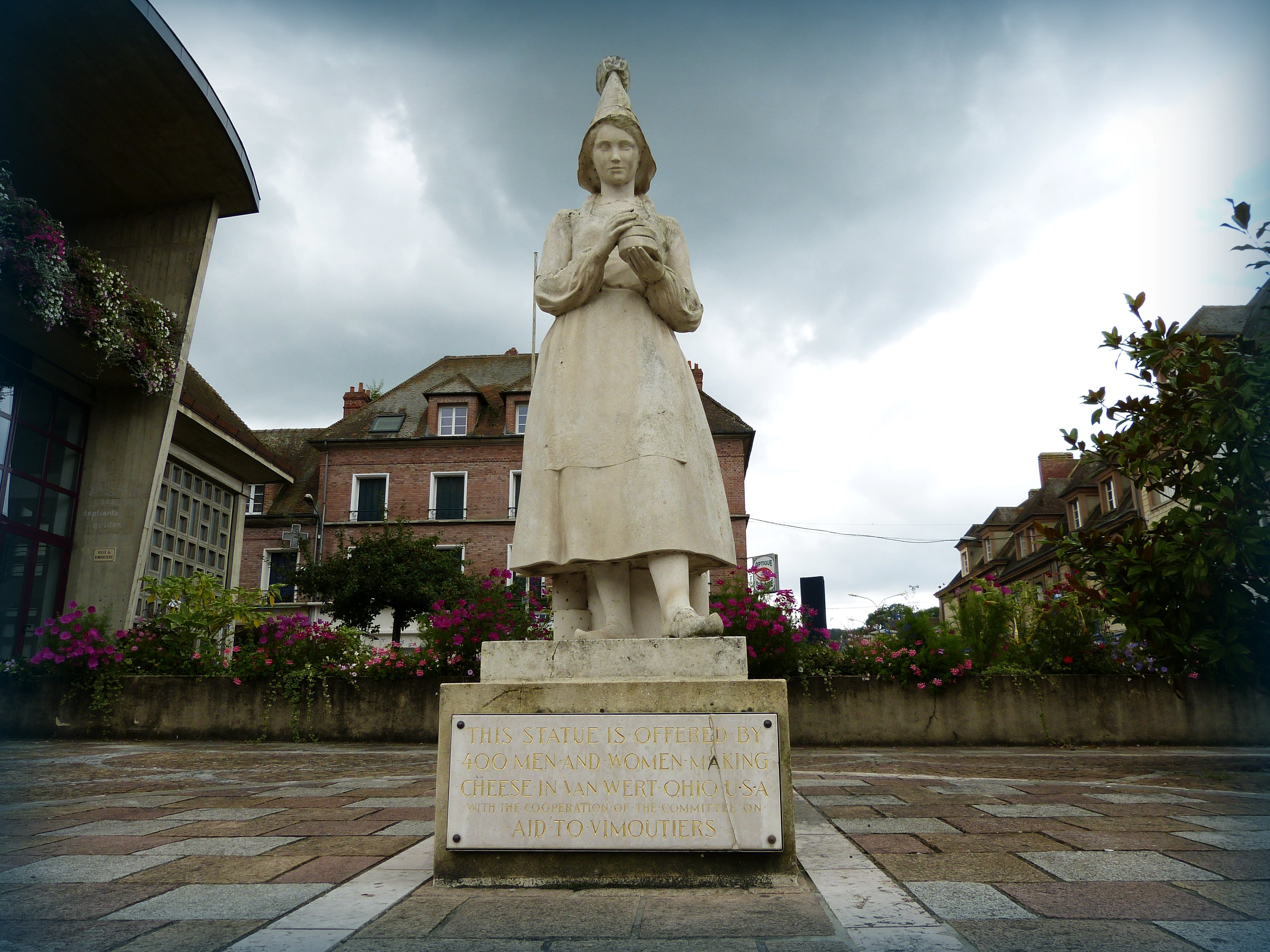
- Replacement statue
- Born: April 28, 1761; Crouttes (Orne)
- Died: November 9, 1844 (aged 83); Vimoutiers (Orne)
- Known for: Invention of Camembert Cheese

Marie Harel (born Marie Catherine Fontaine; April 28, 1761 – November 9, 1844) was a French cheesemaker, who, along with Abbot Charles-Jean Bonvoust, invented Camembert cheese, according to local legend.

== Personal life ==
The sources show profound disagreements on the facts of Harel's biography, including different dates of birth and death. For example, the tombstone in Camembert states, "Marie Harel, 1791-1845 / Elle inventa le Camembert". It is possible that the sources confuse two Maries, a mother and a daughter, that were both notable cheesemakers.

Harel née Fontaine grew up in Camembert, a commune included in the Normandy region, which was an area that consisted of a rural village that, at the time, specialized in agriculture because of the fertile nearby fields and orchards.

Harel married Jacques Harel on May 10, 1785 and later had a daughter, whose husband—Victor Paynel—passed the cheese onto Napoleon III.

== Introduction of Camembert ==
Harel’s family had been long known for their cheesemaking in the Normandy region, but it was only when (as legend has) Harel cultivated her own style of cheese with the help of Abbé Bonvoust, a priest who took refuge from the French Revolution in her Beaumoncel Manner in 1790. Bonvoust was said to have provided Harel with knowledge of the Brie-making process—a technique he learned as a cheesemaker himself—allowing her to carefully cultivate her own spin of his recipe. In perfecting this recipe, Harel decided to create the cheese in smaller wheels rather than the larger ones of Brie, later affecting its supply chain efficiency.

In an attempt to refine the current cheese of the region (a pain point), Harel developed this new cheese that provided a more “earthy aroma, creamy taste, and edible white rind.” It is also important to note that this cheese was made purely from raw cow’s milk rather than a cream additive. This new innovative cheese eventually made its way to the food packs of WW1 soldiers because of its ability to maintain freshness after the invention of mass produced round wooden boxes.

== Harel’s Camembert Influence ==
The invention of the Camembert cheese did not increase the overall consumption of cheese, rather it added credibility and created a positive reputation of Norman produce. By the 1920s, Camembert was the most widely used cheese within France, but it still had several competitors, including the (in comparison) posh Roquefort. Despite being viewed as an inferior cheese by itself, the glorification of its creator—Harel—developed a more adored status, making it stand out. All who were cheese connoisseurs developed a keen fascination of this Norman cheese, questioning its genius founder’s upbringing and “circumstances surrounding her innovation.”

== Remembering Harel ==
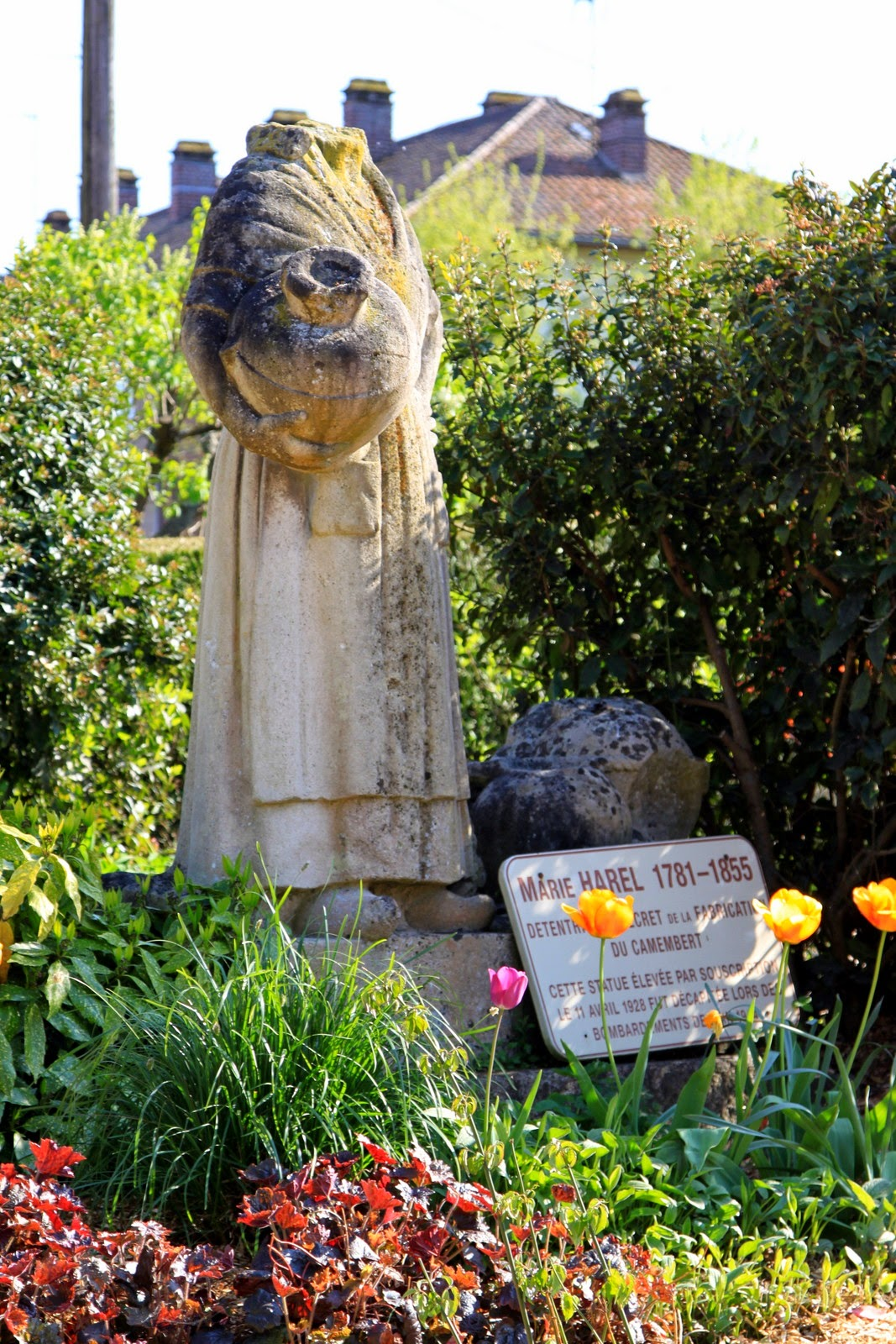
Damaged statue to Marie Harel. Note the different years of birth and death

In 1856, the town of Camembert constructed a new statue of Harel, honoring the invention of its beloved cheese. Later in 1944, the statue was destroyed after a bombardment by Allied forces in the second World War, but was later funded and rebuilt in the same place in 1953 by a group of farmers based in Van Wert, Ohio.

== See also ==
- Types of cheese
