= Haute Vallée de la Touques et affluents =

Protected area in France

Haute Vallée de la Touques et affluents translated as the Upper Touques valley and tributaries is a Natura 2000 conservation area that is 1,400 hectares in size.

== Geography ==
The area is a very hilly, shaped by the rivers which dug their beds into the limestone formations of the Cenomanian geological layer. The area features a mix of Beech-oak forests, dry limestone hillsides and also contain bat caves.

It is spread across 11 different communes within the Orne department and a single commune within the Calvados department;

1. Aubry-le-Panthou
2. Avernes-Saint-Gourgon
3. Le Bosc-Renoult
4. Canapville
5. Gouffern en Auge
6. Livarot-Pays-d'Auge
7. Montreuil-la-Cambe
8. Pontchardon
9. Roiville
10. Saint-Gervais-des-Sablons
11. Sap-en-Auge
12. Ticheville

== Conservation ==
The conservation area has ten species listed in Annex 2 of the Habitats Directive;

1. European bullhead
2. Cottus perifretum
3. Atlantic stream crayfish
4. Marsh fritillary
5. Western barbastelle
6. Bechstein's bat
7. Geoffroy's bat
8. Greater mouse-eared bat
9. Greater horseshoe bat
10. Lesser horseshoe bat

In addition the Natura 2000 site has 7 habitats protected under the Habitats Directive.
