= Canton of Vimoutiers =

Coordinates: 48.93°N 0.20°E

The canton of Vimoutiers is an administrative division of the Orne department, northwestern France. Its borders were modified at the French canton reorganisation which came into effect in March 2015. Its seat is in Vimoutiers.

It consists of the following communes:

1. Aubry-le-Panthou
2. Avernes-Saint-Gourgon
3. Le Bosc-Renoult
4. Camembert
5. Canapville
6. Les Champeaux
7. Champosoult
8. Chaumont
9. Cisai-Saint-Aubin
10. Coulmer
11. Croisilles
12. Crouttes
13. La Fresnaie-Fayel
14. Fresnay-le-Samson
15. Gacé
16. Guerquesalles
17. Mardilly
18. Ménil-Hubert-en-Exmes
19. Neuville-sur-Touques
20. Orgères
21. Pontchardon
22. Le Renouard
23. Résenlieu
24. Roiville
25. Saint-Aubin-de-Bonneval
26. Saint-Evroult-de-Montfort
27. Saint-Germain-d'Aunay
28. Le Sap-André
29. Sap-en-Auge
30. Ticheville
31. La Trinité-des-Laitiers
32. Vimoutiers
