= Chaumont, Orne =

Chaumont
- Commune
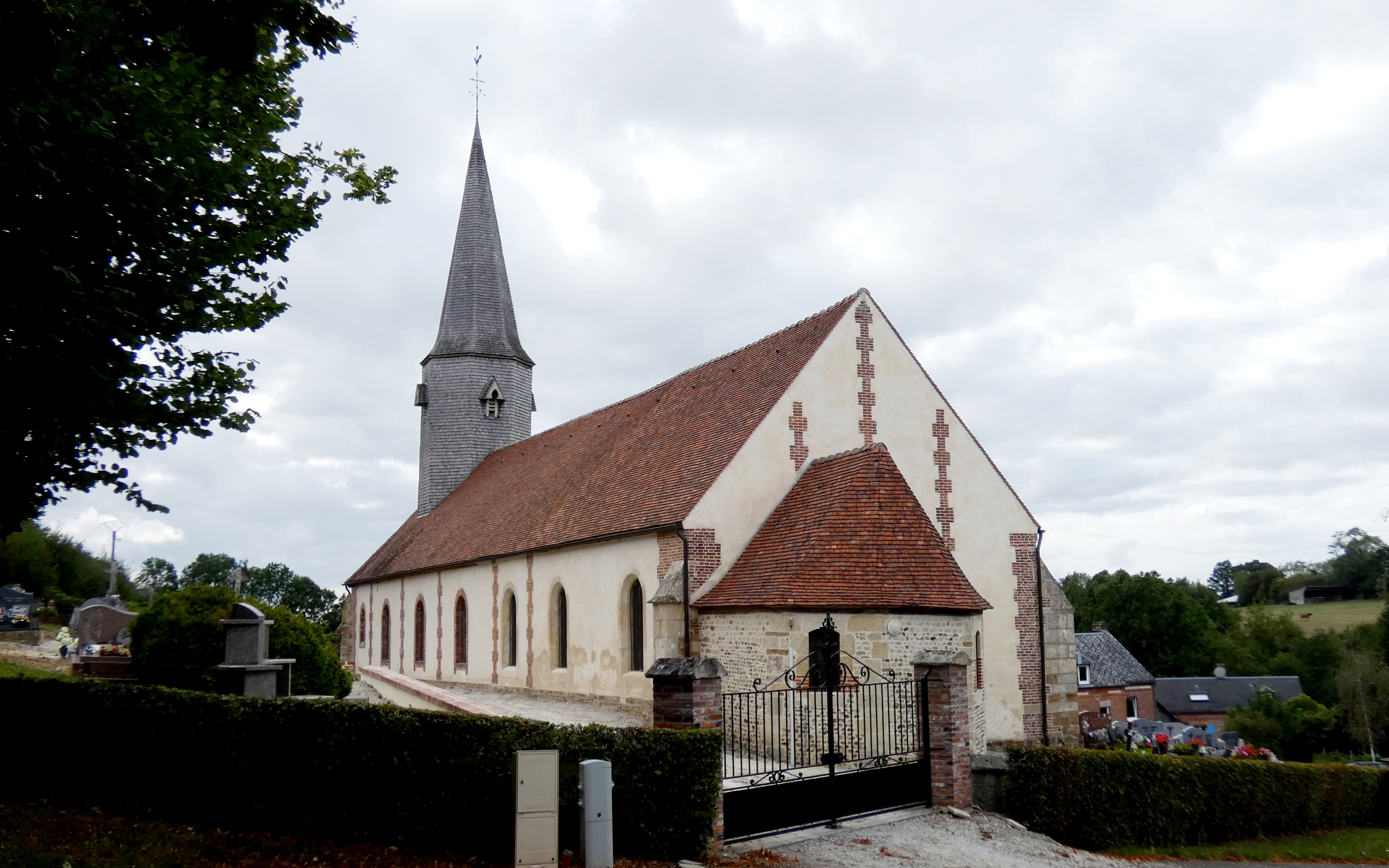
- Location of Chaumont
- Location within France Location within Normandy
- Coordinates: 48°50′09″N 0°19′32″E
- Country: France
- Region: Normandy
- Department: Orne
- Arrondissement: Mortagne-au-Perche
- Canton: Vimoutiers
- Intercommunality: Vallées d'Auge et du Merlerault

Government
  - Mayor (2020–2026): Thérèse Colette
- Area^{1}: 19.51 km^{2} (7.53 sq mi)
- Elevation: 300 m (980 ft)
- Highest elevation: 304 m (997 ft)
- Lowest elevation: 189 m (620 ft)
- Population (2023): 165
  - Density: 8.46/km^{2} (21.9/sq mi)
- Time zone: UTC+01:00 (CET)
  - Summer (DST): UTC+02:00 (CEST)
- INSEE/Postal code: 61103 /61230
- ^{1} French Land Register data, which excludes lakes, ponds, glaciers > 1 km^{2} (0.386 sq mi or 247 acres) and river estuaries.

Chaumont (French pronunciation: [ʃomɔ̃]) is a commune in the Orne department in north-western France.

== Geography ==
The commune is made up of the following collection of villages and hamlets, Launay and Chaumont.

The commune along with another 69 communes shares part of a 4,747 hectare, Natura 2000 conservation area, called Risle, Guiel, Charentonne.

Three streams, Ruisseau de la Bigotiere, Ruisseau des Aumones and the Ruisseau de Chaumont flow through the commune.

== Transport ==
Aire de Service Les Haras - Is a service station on the A28 autoroute that also crosses into the neighbouring commune of Le Sap-André.

== See also ==
- Communes of the Orne department
