= Le Renouard =

- Commune
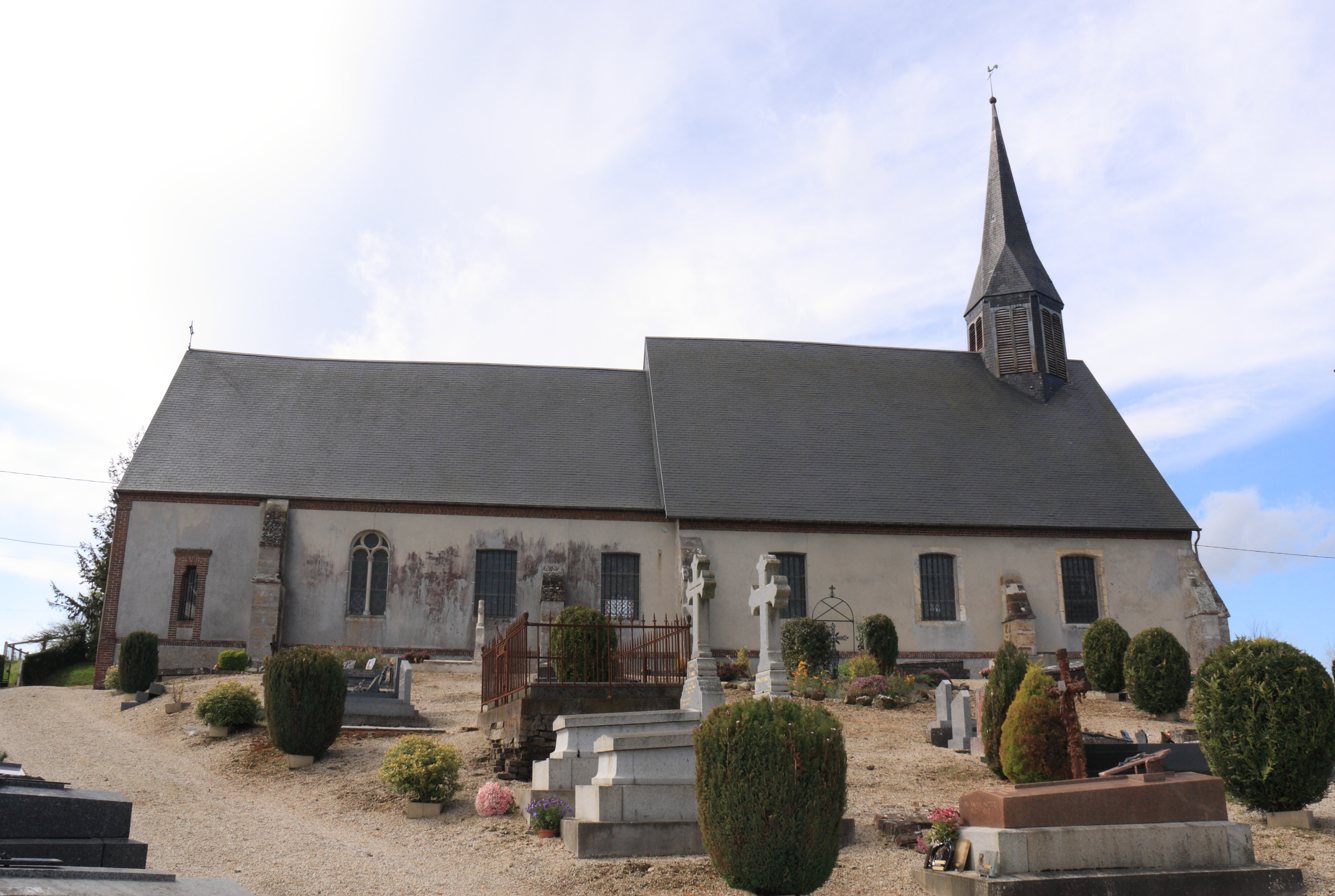
- The church in Le Renouard
- Location of Le Renouard
- Location within France Location within Normandy
- Coordinates: 48°55′19″N 0°06′07″E
- Country: France
- Region: Normandy
- Department: Orne
- Arrondissement: Mortagne-au-Perche
- Canton: Vimoutiers
- Intercommunality: Vallées d'Auge et du Merlerault

Government
  - Mayor (2020–2026): Karim Bounab
- Area^{1}: 14.48 km^{2} (5.59 sq mi)
- Elevation: 164 m (538 ft)
- Highest elevation: 266 m (873 ft)
- Lowest elevation: 93 m (305 ft)
- Population (2023): 203
  - Density: 14.0/km^{2} (36.3/sq mi)
- Time zone: UTC+01:00 (CET)
  - Summer (DST): UTC+02:00 (CEST)
- INSEE/Postal code: 61346 /61120
- ^{1} French Land Register data, which excludes lakes, ponds, glaciers > 1 km^{2} (0.386 sq mi or 247 acres) and river estuaries.

Le Renouard (French pronunciation: [lə ʁənwaʁ]) is a commune in the Orne department in north-western France.

== Geography ==
The commune is made up of the following collection of villages and hamlets, La Vignette, Le Renouard and L'Hôtellerie Faroult.

The river La Monne flows through the commune. in addition four streams also pass through the commune, Ruisseau de Tanqueray, La Monne, Ruisseau du Chateau and the Ruisseau de Crouttes.

== Points of interest ==
=== National heritage sites ===
The Commune has two buildings and areas listed as a Monument historique.

- Coulonche Farm a 15th-century Farm house, that was registered as a monument in 2003.
- Manor of Corday a 16th-century Manor house, that was visited by Charlotte Corday who had a room here, it was registered as a Monument historique in 1948.

== See also ==
- Communes of the Orne department
