= Crouttes =

- Commune
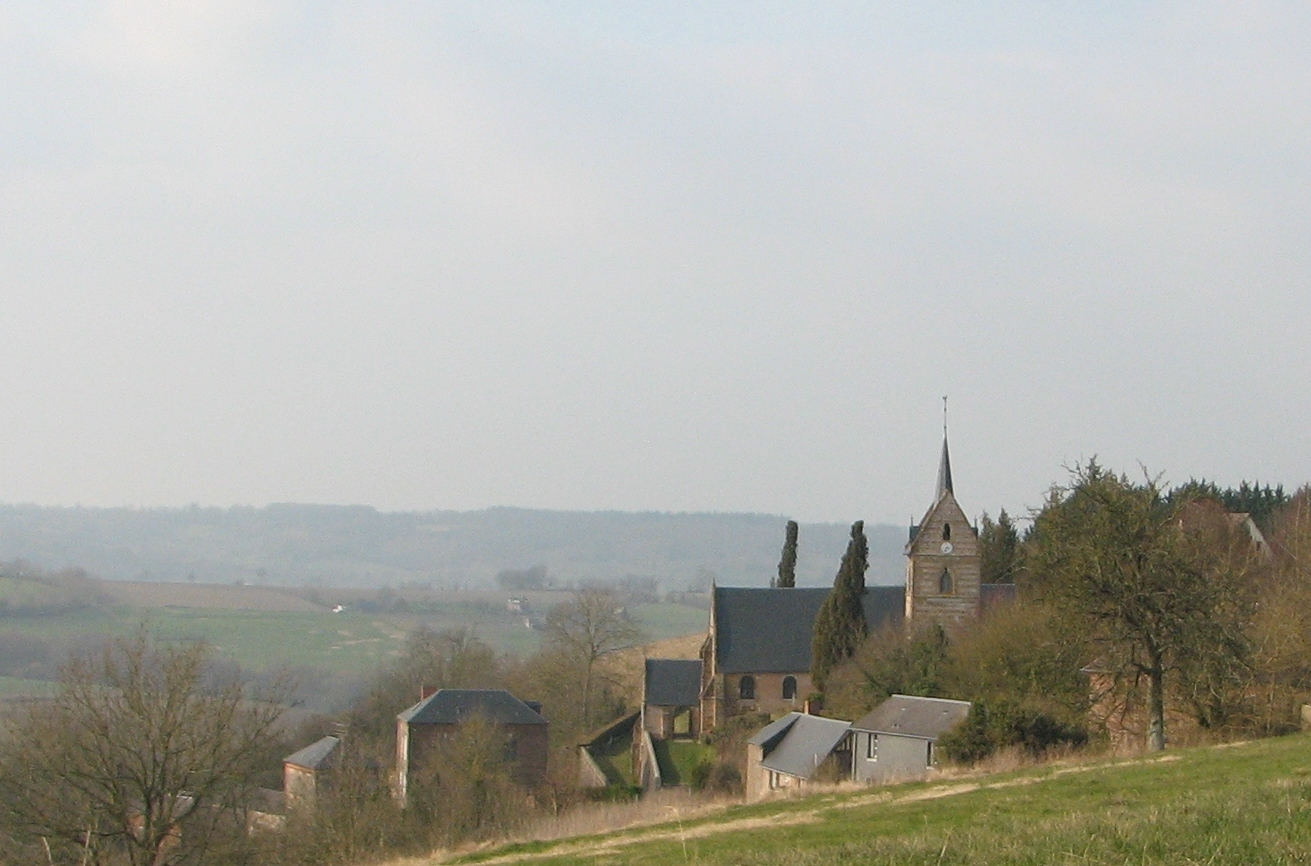
- The church and surroundings in Crouttes
- Location of Crouttes
- Location within France Location within Normandy
- Coordinates: 48°55′28″N 0°08′23″E
- Country: France
- Region: Normandy
- Department: Orne
- Arrondissement: Mortagne-au-Perche
- Canton: Vimoutiers
- Intercommunality: Vallées d'Auge et du Merlerault

Government
  - Mayor (2020–2026): Gérard Burel
- Area^{1}: 13.47 km^{2} (5.20 sq mi)
- Elevation: 240 m (790 ft)
- Highest elevation: 259 m (850 ft)
- Lowest elevation: 90 m (300 ft)
- Population (2023): 306
  - Density: 22.7/km^{2} (58.8/sq mi)
- Time zone: UTC+01:00 (CET)
  - Summer (DST): UTC+02:00 (CEST)
- INSEE/Postal code: 61139 /61120
- ^{1} French Land Register data, which excludes lakes, ponds, glaciers > 1 km^{2} (0.386 sq mi or 247 acres) and river estuaries.

Crouttes (French pronunciation: [kʁut]) is a commune in the Orne department in north-western France.

== Geography ==
The commune has one river, the Monne and six streams, the Crouttes, the Chateau, the Redoutiere, the Moulin Neuf, the Champeaux & the Bois du Four running through its borders.

== Notable buildings and places ==
The old Saint-Michel priory is an ancient Priory dating back to the 13th century with significant additions made to it over the next 200 years. It is now listed as a Monument historique

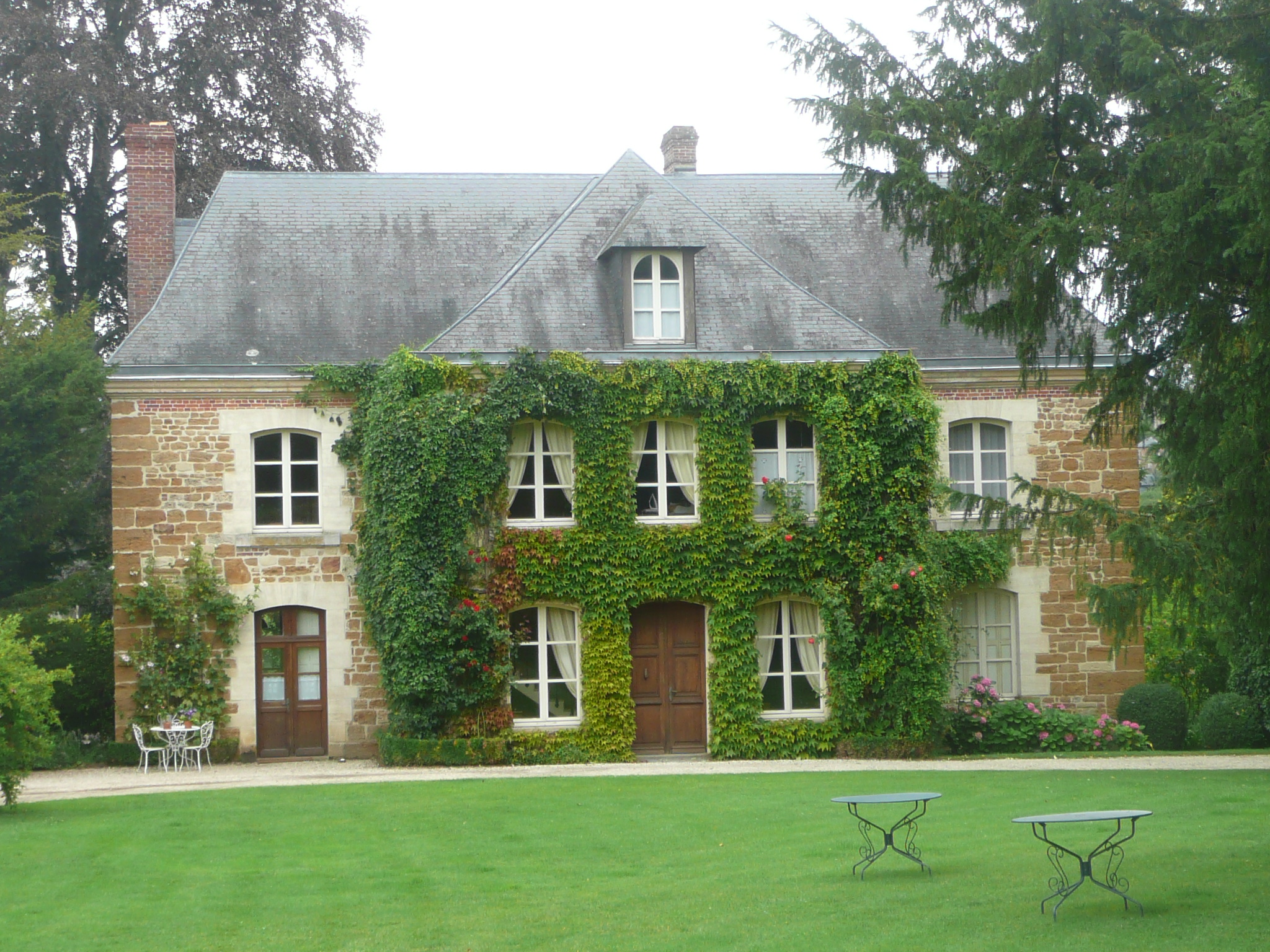
Prieuré Saint-Michel

== Notable people ==
- Marie Harel (1761 - 1844) the inventor of Camembert cheese, was born here.

== See also ==
- Communes of the Orne department
