= Ménil-Hubert-en-Exmes =

- Commune
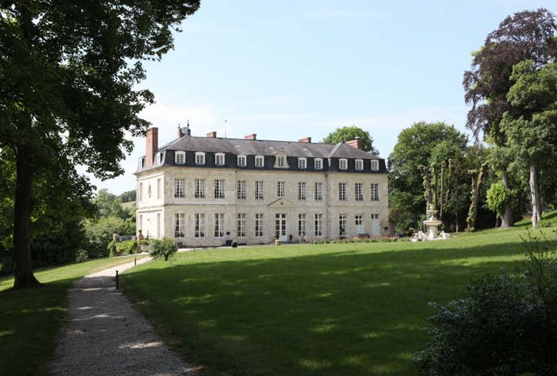
- The chateau in Ménil-Hubert-en-Exmes
- Location of Ménil-Hubert-en-Exmes
- Location within France Location within Normandy
- Coordinates: 48°48′51″N 0°13′34″E
- Country: France
- Region: Normandy
- Department: Orne
- Arrondissement: Mortagne-au-Perche
- Canton: Vimoutiers
- Intercommunality: Vallées d'Auge et du Merlerault

Government
  - Mayor (2020–2026): Émile Lampérière
- Area^{1}: 10.34 km^{2} (3.99 sq mi)
- Elevation: 300 m (980 ft)
- Highest elevation: 296 m (971 ft)
- Lowest elevation: 169 m (554 ft)
- Population (2023): 126
  - Density: 12.2/km^{2} (31.6/sq mi)
- Time zone: UTC+01:00 (CET)
  - Summer (DST): UTC+02:00 (CEST)
- INSEE/Postal code: 61268 /61230
- ^{1} French Land Register data, which excludes lakes, ponds, glaciers > 1 km^{2} (0.386 sq mi or 247 acres) and river estuaries.

Ménil-Hubert-en-Exmes (French pronunciation: [menil ybɛʁ ɑ̃.n‿ɛm]) is a commune in the Orne department in northwestern France.

== Geography ==
The commune is made up of the following collection of villages and hamlets, La Bergerie, La Farinière and Ménil-Hubert-en-Exmes.

The commune is part of the area known as Pays d'Auge.

The Commune is one of 27 communes that make up the Natura 2000 protected area of Bocages et vergers du sud Pays d'Auge.

The commune has one river, the Vie and a single stream, the Douy running through its borders.

== Notable buildings and places ==
=== National heritage sites ===
Chateau Menil-Hubert-en-Exmes an 18th-century chateau that was classified as a Monument historique in 2010. The artist Edgar Degas was invited to stay at the chateau in 1859 and had a workshop built for him to work in.

== See also ==
- Communes of the Orne department
