= Villebadin =

- Part of Gouffern en Auge
- Location of Villebadin
- Location within France Location within Normandy
- Coordinates: 48°46′47″N 0°09′19″E
- Country: France
- Region: Normandy
- Department: Orne
- Arrondissement: Argentan
- Canton: Argentan-2
- Commune: Gouffern en Auge
- Area^{1}: 12.93 km^{2} (4.99 sq mi)
- Elevation: 141 m (463 ft)
- Highest elevation: 230 m (750 ft)
- Lowest elevation: 112 m (367 ft)
- Population (2022): 123
  - Density: 9.51/km^{2} (24.6/sq mi)
- Time zone: UTC+01:00 (CET)
  - Summer (DST): UTC+02:00 (CEST)
- Postal code: 61310
- ^{1} French Land Register data, which excludes lakes, ponds, glaciers > 1 km^{2} (0.386 sq mi or 247 acres) and river estuaries.

Villebadin (French pronunciation: [vilbadɛ̃]) is a former commune in the Orne department in north-western France. On 1 January 2017, it was merged into the new commune Gouffern en Auge.

== Heraldry ==
Arms of Villebadin	The arms of Villebadin are blazoned : Sable, a lion per fess Or and argent, armed and langued gules.

== Manoir ==
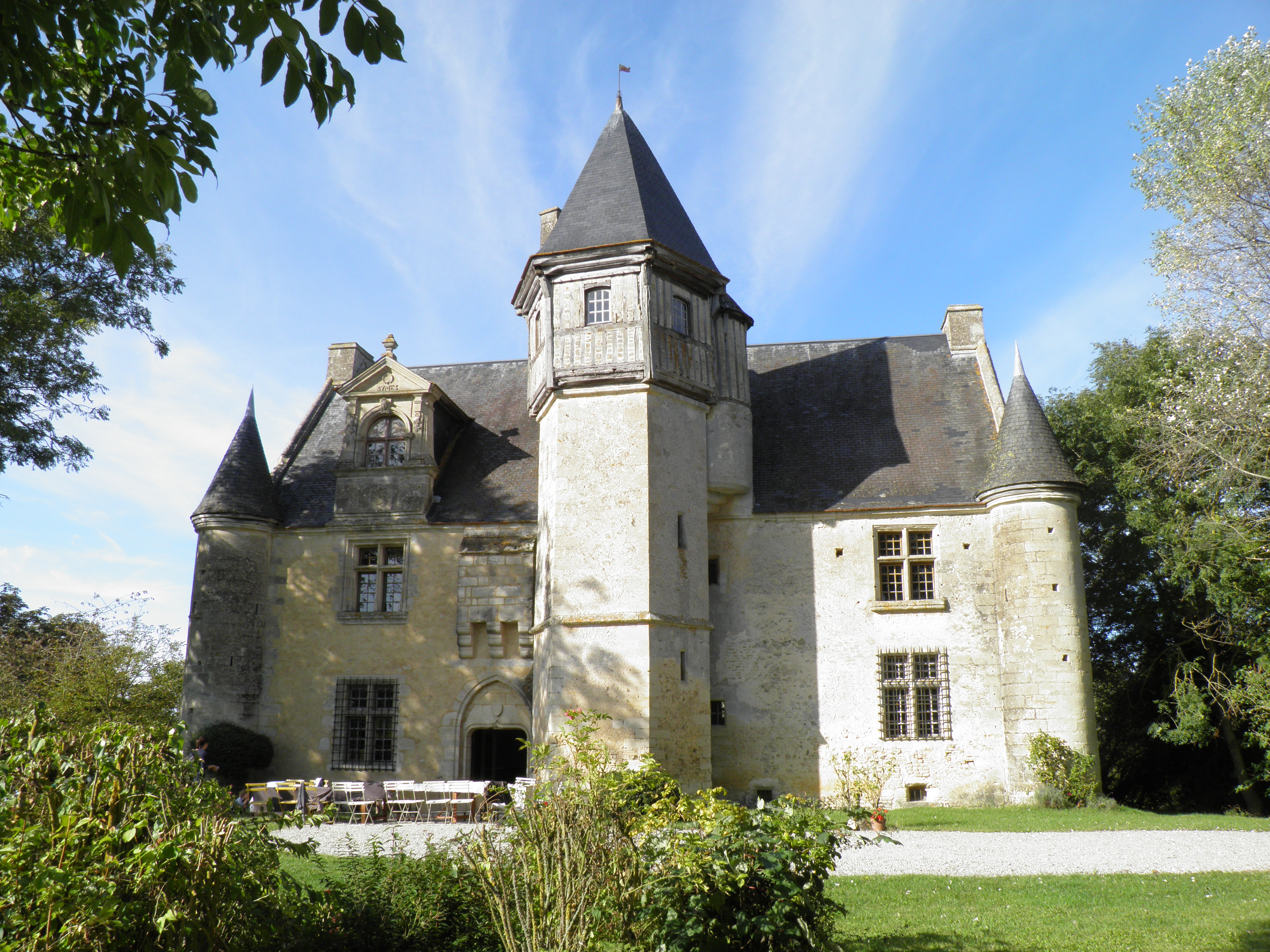
Le manoir d'Argentelles at Villebadin

From 1969 archeologist Robert du Mesnil du Buisson worked to raise funds to restore the local manoir.

== See also ==
- Communes of the Orne department
