= Avernes-Saint-Gourgon =

- Commune
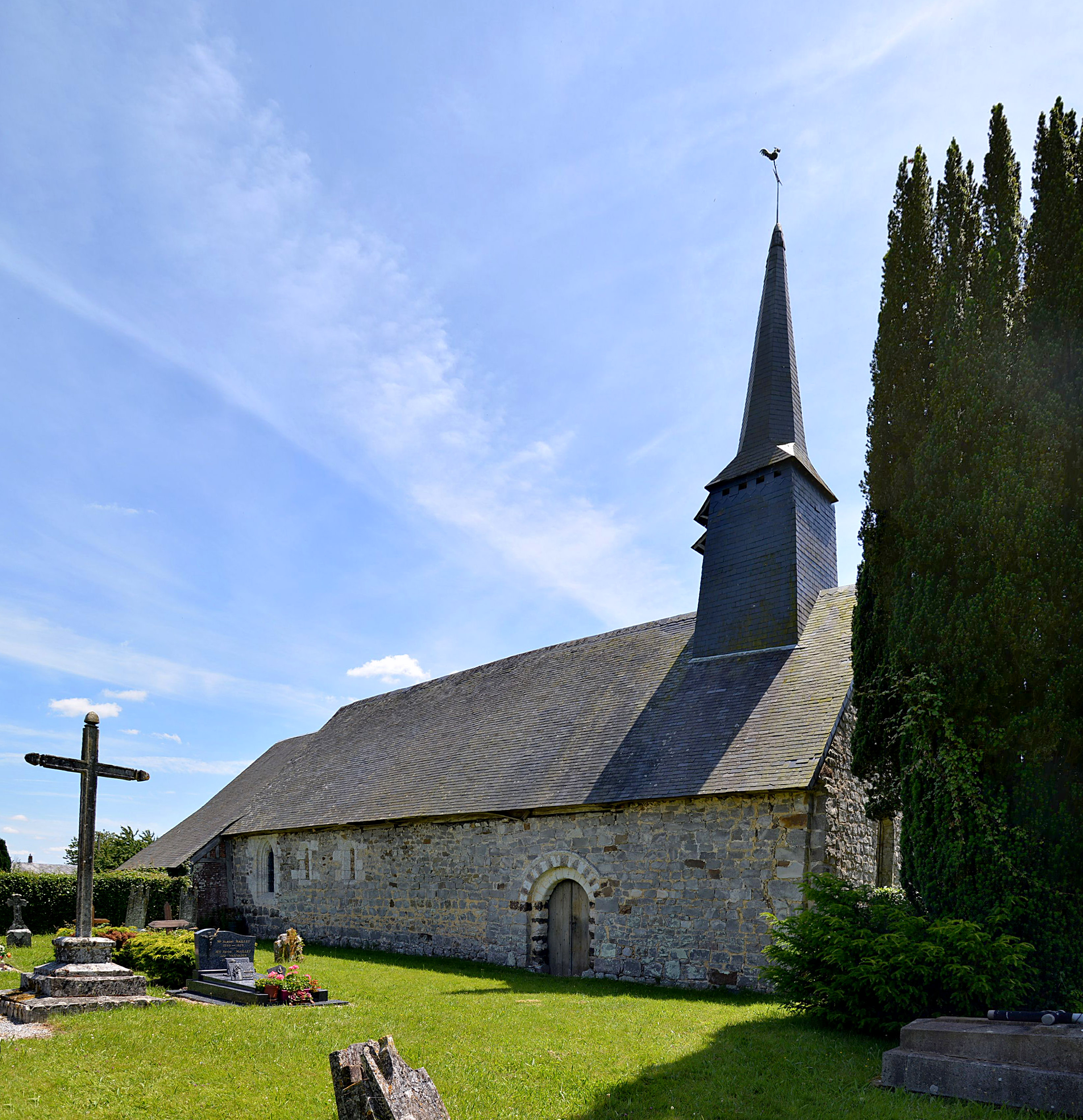
- The church in Avernes-Saint-Gourgon
- Location of Avernes-Saint-Gourgon
- Location within France Location within Normandy
- Coordinates: 48°56′23″N 0°19′13″E
- Country: France
- Region: Normandy
- Department: Orne
- Arrondissement: Mortagne-au-Perche
- Canton: Vimoutiers
- Intercommunality: CC Vallées Auge Merlerault

Government
  - Mayor (2020–2026): Christophe Bignon
- Area^{1}: 12.13 km^{2} (4.68 sq mi)
- Elevation: 242 m (794 ft)
- Highest elevation: 234 m (768 ft)
- Lowest elevation: 121 m (397 ft)
- Population (2023): 71
  - Density: 5.9/km^{2} (15/sq mi)
- Time zone: UTC+01:00 (CET)
  - Summer (DST): UTC+02:00 (CEST)
- INSEE/Postal code: 61018 /61470
- ^{1} French Land Register data, which excludes lakes, ponds, glaciers > 1 km^{2} (0.386 sq mi or 247 acres) and river estuaries.

Avernes-Saint-Gourgon (French pronunciation: [avɛʁn sɛ̃ guʁgɔ̃]) is a commune in the Orne department in northwestern France.

== Geography ==
The commune is made up of the following collection of villages and hamlets, Avernes-Saint-Gourgon and Le Hamel.

The commune along with another 11 communes shares part of a 1,400 hectare, Natura 2000 conservation area, called the Haute Vallée de la Touques et affluents.

The Touques river along with a stream, Ruisseau de la Bigotiere flow through the commune.

== Population ==
Historical population
Year	Pop.	±% p.a.
1968	120	—
1975	78	−5.97%
1982	72	−1.14%
1990	55	−3.31%
1999	63	+1.52%
2007	68	+0.96%
2012	65	−0.90%
2017	56	−2.94%
2023	71	+4.03%
Source: INSEE

== Notable buildings and places ==
=== National heritage sites ===
The Commune has two buildings and areas listed as a Monument historique.

- Church of Saint-Cyr and Sainte-Julitte of Saint-Cyr-d'Estrancourt is an 11th-century church, declared as a monument in 1998.
- Saint-Gourgon Church is a 19th-century church, declared as a monument in 2006.

== See also ==
- Communes of the Orne department
