= Vimoutiers =

- Commune
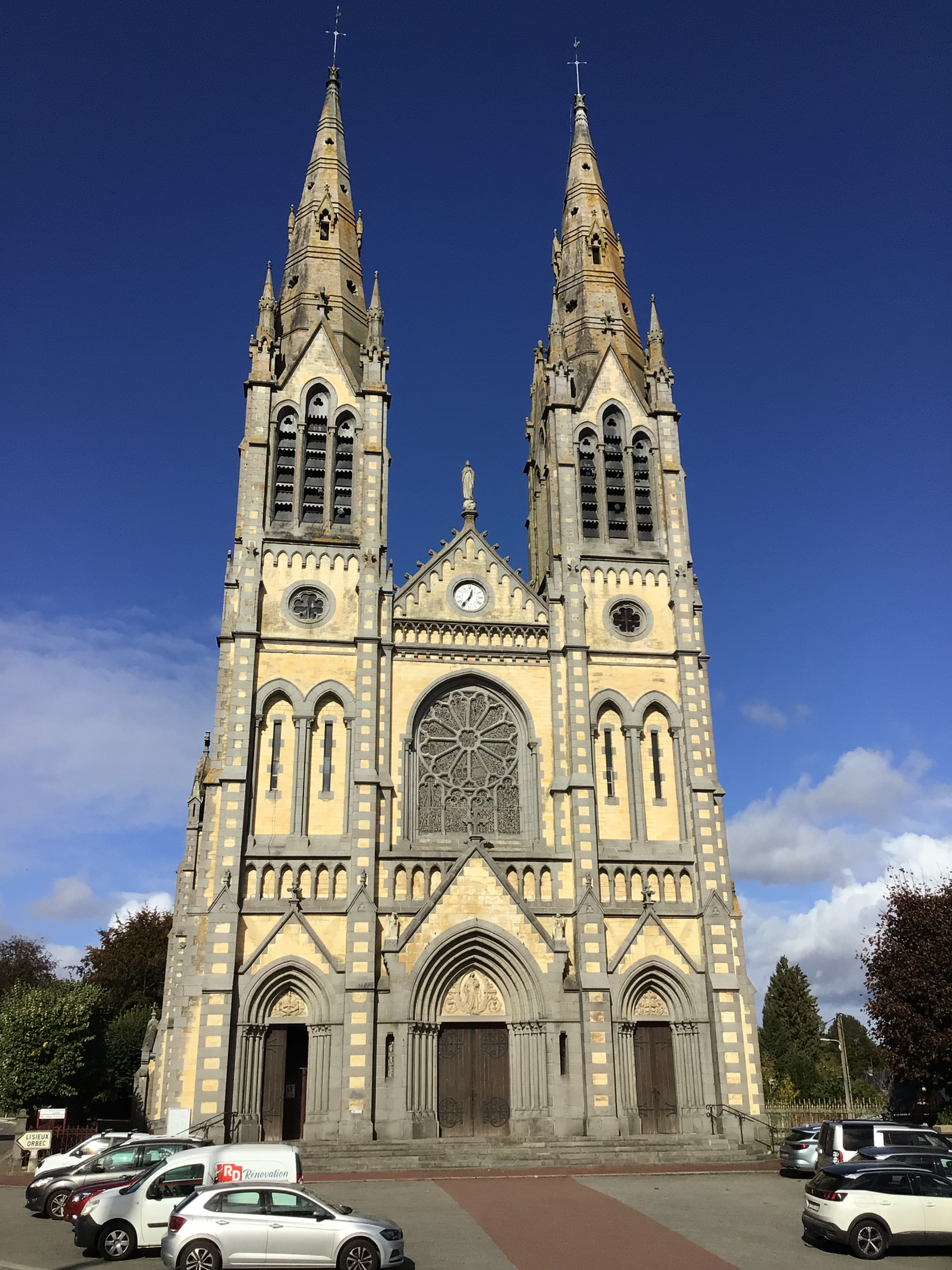
- The church in Vimoutiers

- Coat of arms
- Location of Vimoutiers
- Location within France Location within Normandy
- Coordinates: 48°56′N 0°12′E
- Country: France
- Region: Normandy
- Department: Orne
- Arrondissement: Mortagne-au-Perche
- Canton: Vimoutiers

Government
  - Mayor (2020–2026): Guy Romain
- Area^{1}: 16.15 km^{2} (6.24 sq mi)
- Elevation: 134 m (440 ft)
- Highest elevation: 236 m (774 ft)
- Lowest elevation: 92 m (302 ft)
- Population (2023): 2,978
  - Density: 184.4/km^{2} (477.6/sq mi)
- Time zone: UTC+01:00 (CET)
  - Summer (DST): UTC+02:00 (CEST)
- INSEE/Postal code: 61508 /61120
- ^{1} French Land Register data, which excludes lakes, ponds, glaciers > 1 km^{2} (0.386 sq mi or 247 acres) and river estuaries.

Vimoutiers (French pronunciation: [vimutje]) is a commune in the Orne department in north-western France.

The finish line of the Paris–Camembert bicycle race is Vimoutiers.

== Geography ==
The commune is made up of the following collection of villages and hamlets, Les Monceaux', Ferme de Cutesson, La Hunière, Le Vitou, Le Pont Percé, La Fauvetière and Vimoutiers. The commune is spread over an area of 16.15 square kilometres (3,990 acres) with a maximum altitude of 236 metres (774 ft 3 in) and minimum of 92 metres (301 ft 10 in)

Vimoutiers has two rivers running through it the Vie and the Viette in addition to four streams, the Fontaine de la Roche, Souze, plus the Moulin Neuf.

=== Land distribution ===
The 2018 CORINE Land Cover assessment shows the vast majority of the land in the commune, 85% (495 hectares (1,220 acres)) is Meadows. The rest of the land is urbanised at 8%, with the last 6% spread almost equally at 3% each between Arable land and industrial or commercial areas.

== History ==
In 1040 while besieging a nearby Norman castle, Alan III, Duke of Brittany died suddenly in Vimoutiers, then a possession of the Duchy of Normandy. His death was thought to be caused by poisoning.

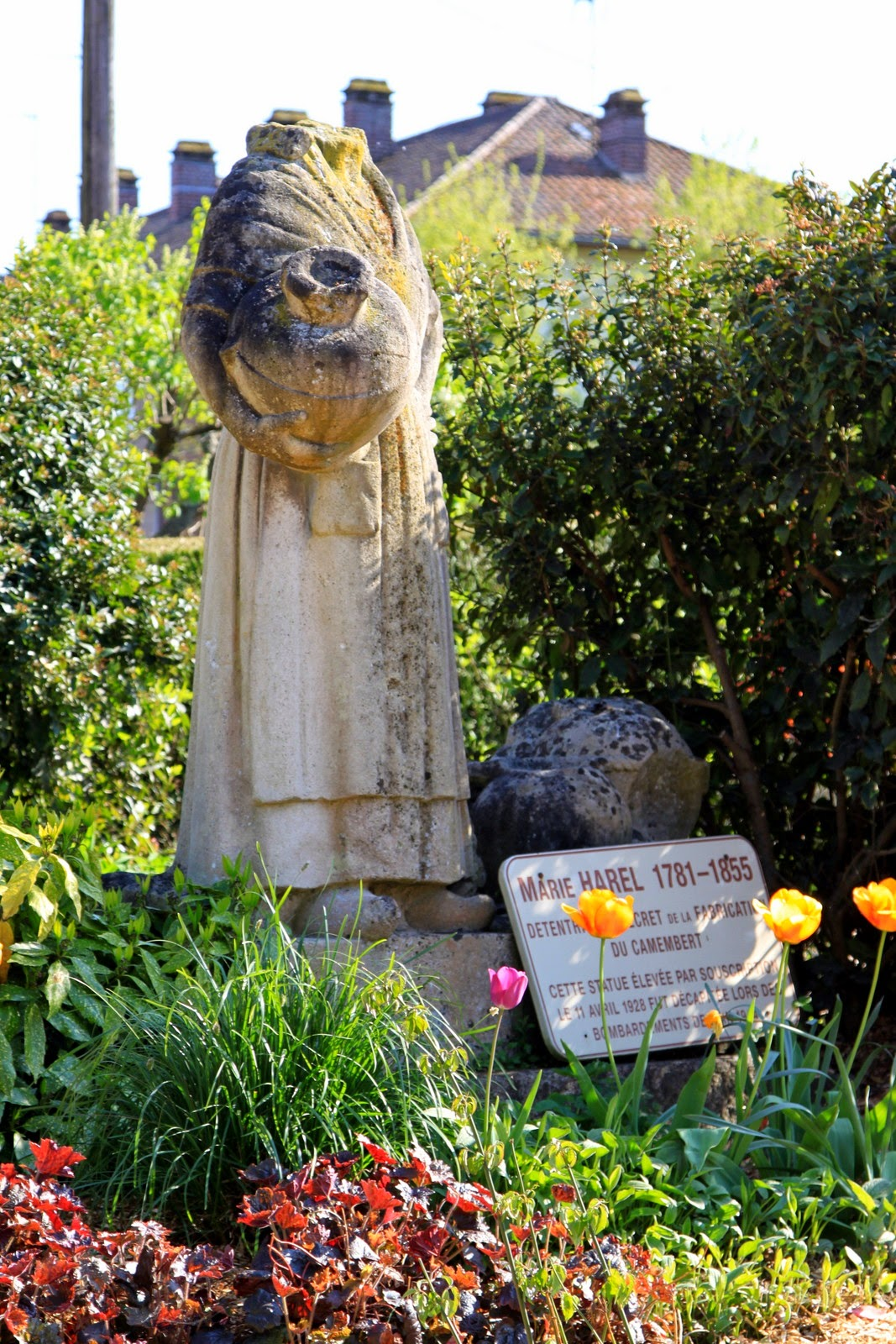
Damaged statue to Marie Harel "inventor" of Camembert cheese

On 14 June 1944, during the Battle of Normandy, Vimoutiers was bombarded by Allied forces. The village was destroyed and 220 people died. With the encouragement of Margaret Mitchell, the author of Gone with the Wind, the members of Pilot Club International raised funds to restore the city. La Place du Pilot Club International is a square in Vimoutiers which commemorates their generosity. 400 people of Van Wert, Ohio also contributed in the costs of reconstruction and reparation of the town. They volunteered to pay for the replacement of Marie Harel's statue in 1953. This is recorded by a plaque in the market square of Vimoutiers.

== Population ==
Historical population
Year	Pop.	±% p.a.
1968	4,572	—
1975	5,019	+1.34%
1982	4,918	−0.29%
1990	4,723	−0.50%
1999	4,418	−0.74%
2007	3,918	−1.49%
2012	3,675	−1.27%
2017	3,332	−1.94%
2023	2,978	−1.85%
Source: INSEE

== Heraldry ==
Arms of Vimoutiers	The arms of Vimoutiers are blazoned : Azure, a cross Or, between 4 keys addorsed argent.

== Name ==
The name 'Vimoutiers' is a contraction of 'Vie', the name of the small river which runs through the town ('vie' means 'life'), and 'Moutiers', a French word which means 'Monastery'. This name is derived from the fact that there was once a monastery present on the site, near the banks of the river 'Vie.

== Notable buildings and places ==
- Camembert Museum a museum dedicated to the local cheese, Camembert.

=== National heritage sites ===
- Vimoutiers Tiger tank a World War II German Tiger I tank on outdoor display that was listed as a Monument historique in 1975.
- Former Benedictine convent originally a sixteenth century former Benedictines convent, that was registered as a Monument historique in 1985.

== Notable people ==
- Alan III, Duke of Brittany (997–1040), Count of Rennes and duke of Brittany died here.
- Marie Harel (1761–1844), inventor of the Camembert cheese died here.
- Louis Tillaye (1847–1913), politician of the Third Republic was born here.
- Paul Bunel (1882–1918), a Norman photographer, lived here.
- Joseph Laniel (1889–1975), politician of the Fourth Republic was born here.
- Roland Armontel (1904-1983) a French actor was born here.

== Twin towns – sister cities ==
Vimotiers is twinned with:

- Fordingbridge, England, United Kingdom since 1982.
- Châtelet, Belgium since 1994.
- Sontra, Germany since 1971.

== See also ==
- Falaise pocket
- Communes of the Orne department
- Paul Bun0el
