= Haras national du Pin =

French national horse stud farm

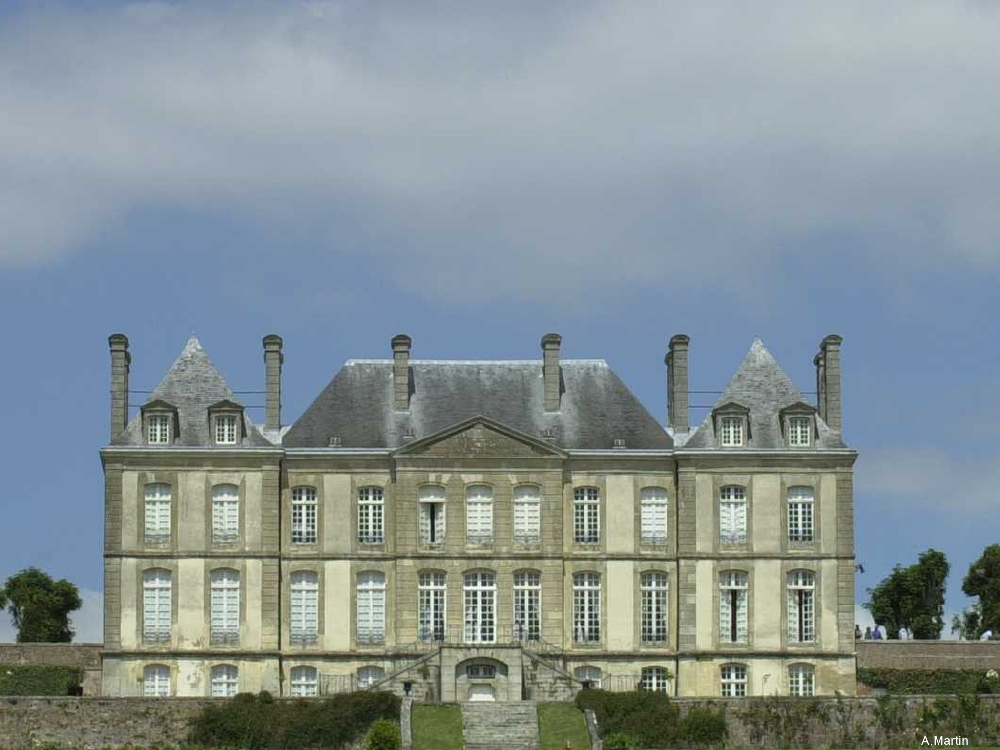
- The Haras du Pin
- Interactive map of the Haras national du Pin area

General information
- Type: Stud farm
- Location: Le Pin-au-Haras, France
- Owner: Public institution

Website
- haras-national-du-pin.com/en/

The Haras national du Pin or Haras du Pin is a French national stud located in Le Pin-au-Haras district, in the Orne (61) department of the southern Normandy region. It is the oldest of the French "Haras Nationaux" (National Studs).

== History ==
In 1665, under Louis XIV, Colbert created the royal studs administration in order to overcome the lack of horses which then prevailed in the entire kingdom; he also wished to improve French equine breeds. The army was then in dire need of horses, and the kingdom was forced to import them from abroad. As soon as the administration was created, royal stallions were selected and sent out to various areas; they were the only ones allowed to breed. Starting from 1668, the army still lacking in horses, private stallions were also allowed to breed after having been approved of by the State.

The area on which to build the first royal stud was chosen in 1714. The quality of the pastures and the easy access to water made Buisson d'Exmes, near Argentan, the perfect spot. The area was bought from Louis de Béchameil de Nointel, (Note: He is the son of Louis Béchameil de Nointel (1630-1703), made famous by the Béchamel sauce bearing his name.) State Counsellor, in exchange for other lands in Picardy. On the 2nd of April 1715, order was given to transfer the haras royal de Saint-Léger to Buisson d'Exmes.

The estate today covers over 2,471 acres. The first stables were built starting in 1715 and the first stallions arrived in 1717. The architectural style is equivalent to the École de Versailles, and Pierre Le Mousseux oversaw the works, following plans which had been drawn by Robert de Cotte, first architect to the Crown and the successor of Jules Hardouin-Mansart. The current buildings (stables and castle) were built under the reign of Louis XV, between 1715 and 1730. The writer Jean de La Varende nicknamed it "the Equestrian Versailles". The terraces were designed by André Le Nôtre in the tradition of French formal gardens. (Note: The attribution to Mansart and Le Nôtre is refuted in Le Haras national du Pin, Versailles du cheval, published by Éditions du Patrimoine–Monum in 2006.)

On 27 January 1790, the destruction and removal of the "Haras" were voted, but it narrowly escaped this fate, the National Assembly at the very last moment deciding to establish there a "depot of the best stallions in the Kingdom". Nevertheless, the functions of the Haras were re-established only under the First French Empire, in 1810. The "École des Haras" was founded in 1840, and on 29 May 1874, a law decreed one should have studied there to occupy any function as an officer of the "Haras".

The stud was occupied by the Prussians in 1871, then by the Germans (June 1940-June 1941). It found itself at the heart of the site of bataille de Normandie, close to Falaise, though without sustaining any damages.

=== The Haras du Pin today ===
The change within the Haras nationaux (national studs) took place at the end of 2013, when breeding as such, the core of their function, was transferred to the private sector. However, the Haras national du Pin maintained its breeding activities thanks to a private cooperative of breeders, the SCIC (Cooperative Company of Collective Interest), which brings together various private breeders. The SCIC set their stallions in the 2nd stable. Some National stud stallions were also rented, in order to pursue their breeding career.

The decree of 2 July 2015 created the "Établissement Public Administratif" (a public administrative establishment) named the "Haras national du Pin": the National Stud was detaching itself from the authority of the IFCE (French Institute for Horses and Riding), in order to be jointly managed by the Orne department, the Basse-Normandie region and the State. The Executive Board is presided by Laurent Beauvais, also Chairman of the Lower Normandy Regional Council.

The grounds of the National Stud stretch over the town of Pin-Au-Haras, but also over the neighbouring ones of Exmes, La Cochère, Silly-en-Gouffern and Ginai. All are classified as historic monuments.

The estate is managed by the "EPA Haras national du Pin", the "IFCE" (French Institute for Horses and Riding), the "ONF" (National Forestry Office) and the "INRA" (National Institute for Agricultural Research), along with an experimental farm with over 1,000 heads of cattle.

In 2019 the IFCE announced it would stop financially supporting the stud (it was paying approximately 75% of the employee salaries) and declared the salary payments would cease as of 2022.

== National stud activities ==
=== Tourism and culture ===
The stud welcomes several tens of thousand visitors every year. It offers guided tours of the Haras du Pin, tours of the Haras castle as well as themed tours (saddlery, blacksmithing, horse breeding). The "Discovery Trail" tour of the 1st stable (a horse museum) is available all the year round. The famous "Jeudis du Pin", or "Thursdays at Le Pin" consist in a presentation of different breeds of horses from the National stud. They take place from June to September. For about ten years now, as well, the Haras du Pin has welcomed each year "artists in residence". These contribute to the "Jeudis du Pin", and also offer presentations of their horses on weekends during the spring and summer seasons (from April to September). Temporary exhibits relative to horses are organized each year in the 1st stable. Every year too, the "Septembre musical de l'Orne" ("Musical September of the Orne") is a festival staging two operas mid-September on the stud's riding-rink.

=== Sporting Competitions ===
The site, which stretches over more than 2,471 acres, welcomes each year well-known competitions, especially show-jumping or eventing. The Haras du Pin has always welcomed international competitions (the European combined driving Championship in 1979, the World Congress of Percherons in 1989 and 2011, or the Eventing World Cup in 2010, 2011 and 2012).

In 2014, the dressage and cross‑country phases of the eventing competition for the World Equestrian Games were held in the Hautbois park, drawing more than 50,000 spectators.

The main competitions to take place in 2016 included the traditional international combined driving competition (July 9 and 10), the "Grand Complet" (August 16 and 21), the international combined driving competition (August 25 and 28), not forgetting the "Pin Races", in early May and early October at the Bergerie racecourse (in Ginai).

=== Training and schooling ===
The "École Supérieure du Cheval et de l'Équitation" ("Higher School for Horses and Riding") is present on the Pin site, having at its disposal high quality training in saddlery, blacksmithing, riding of young horses and combined driving.

The broodmare band conducts genetic research on horse breeding. In 2014, four foals, two females and two males, were born from an embryo transfer. This method, the first of its kind in Europe, will enable the maintenance of rare and endangered horse breeds. In 2015, an equine cryobank was implemented.

== Cultural heritage ==
Beyond its role as a stud farm, the Haras du Pin embodies centuries of cultural heritage through its grounds, horses, vehicles, memorials, and activities.

The castle's terraces overhang the Hautbois park with a view of the estate. Visible from the terraces is the riding arena, built to host the dressage competition of the 2014 FEI World Equestrian Games.

On display in the harness room is a collection of fine carriage-driving harnesses reflecting the style and quality of 19th‑century craftsmanship, including full collar and breastcollar harnesses. Also on display is a saddle bought by the studs for Ouadoud, a Barb horse stallion gifted by Mohammed VI of Morocco in 2009 to honour Franco-Moroccan cooperation.

The stud maintains a large collection of horse-drawn vehicles. The majority are painted in the colors of the Haras Nationaux—navy blue and red with an "H" on the doors. There is a milord carriage, one of only four in French public collections. There is also a phaeton, several breaks; a post chaise (coupé de voyage).

On the grounds lies the grave of Furioso, a Thoroughbred stallion born in 1939. He stood at stud at Haras du Pin from 1946 until his death in 1967 and became an influential sire of sport horses. His progeny number over 300, including many world‑class show jumpers such as Lutteur B, individual gold medalist in show jumping at the 1964 Tokyo Olympics. Furioso was buried on the estate, where his grave has been kept perpetually covered in flowers.

The stud hosts many horses and breeds, but the Percherons are its stars. Typically black or grey, these draft horses weigh between 800 and 1200 kg. They are used to pull traditional carriages and are also presented under saddle, sidesaddle, or in ‘Hungarian Post’ stunt performances. The stables also house other notable breeds, including Arabians, Anglo-Arabians, Selle Français, Lipizzans, Hanoverians, French Trotters, Thoroughbreds, and Andalusians.

== See also ==
- Haras Nationaux
- France Miniature — a miniature park that has built a scale model of Haras du Pin.
- Horses in Normandy
