= Gouffern en Auge =

- Commune
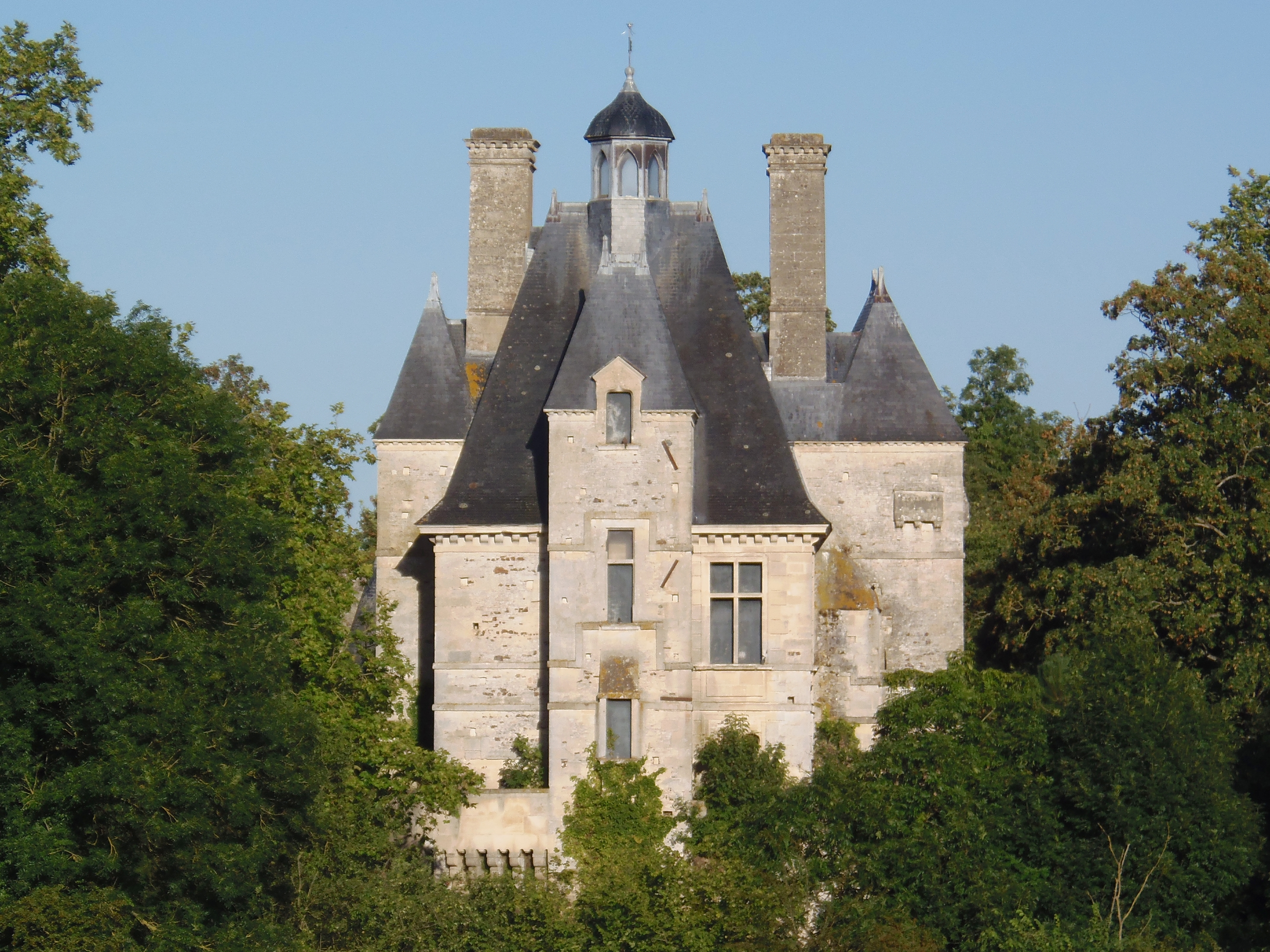
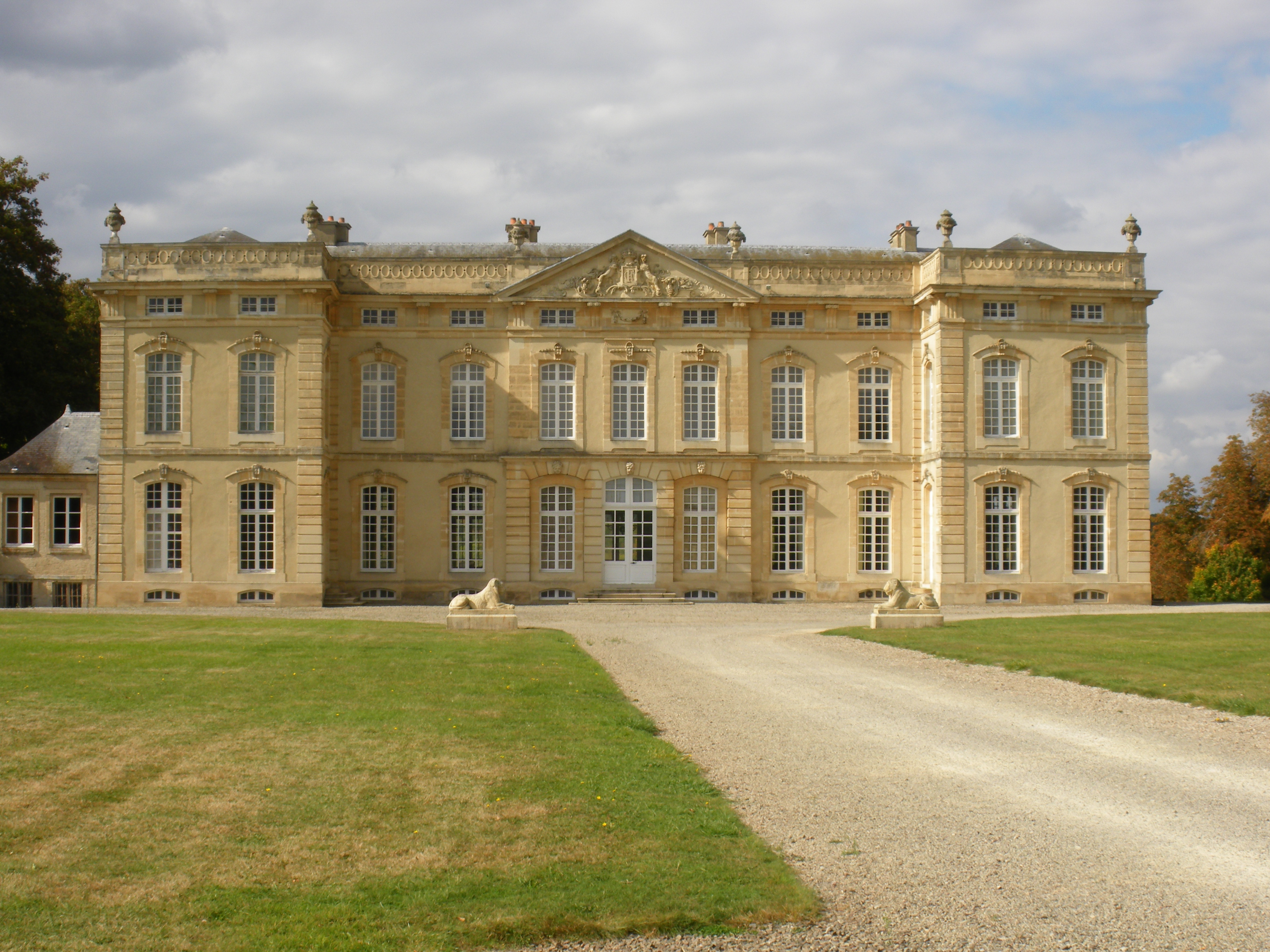
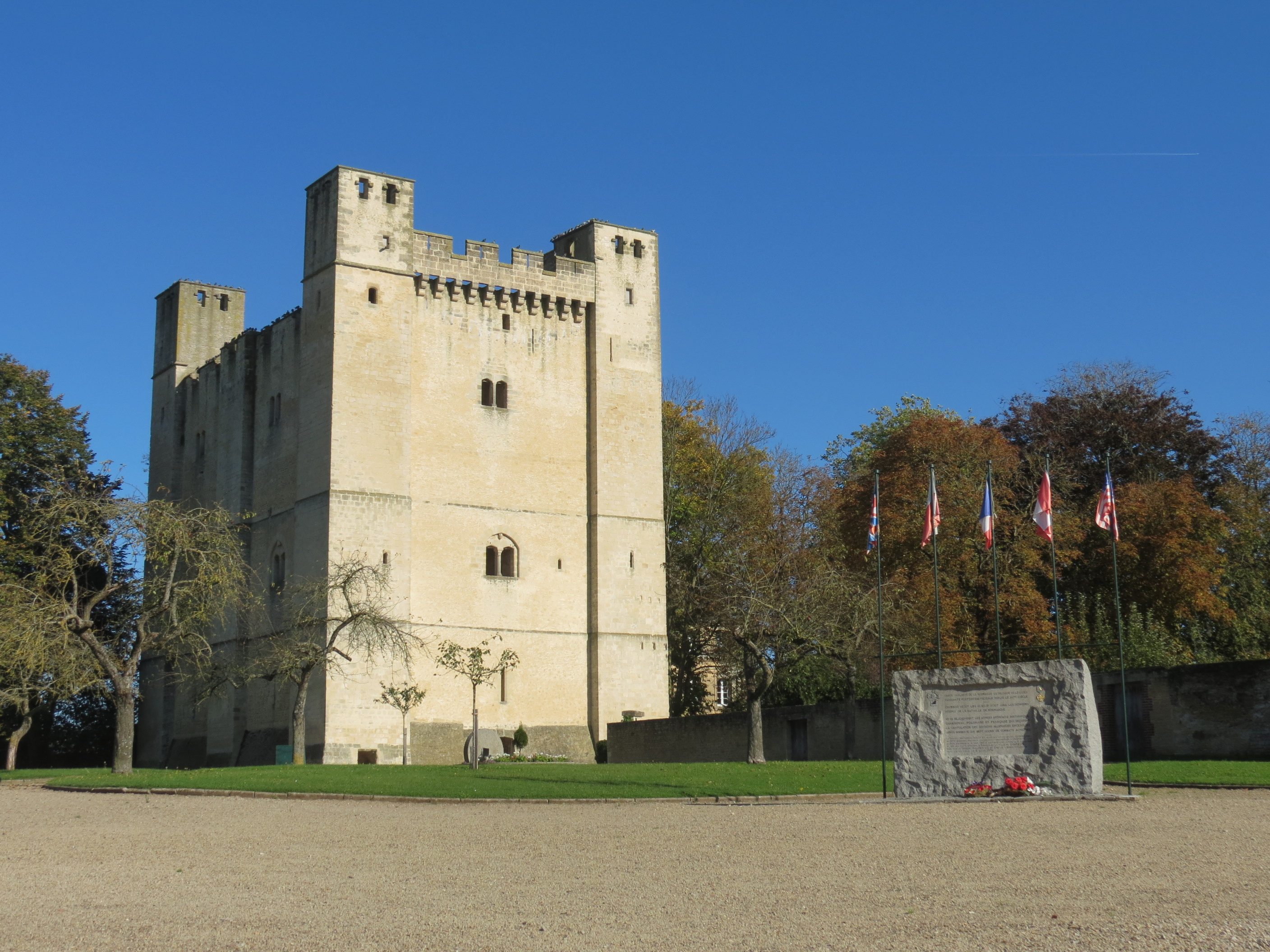
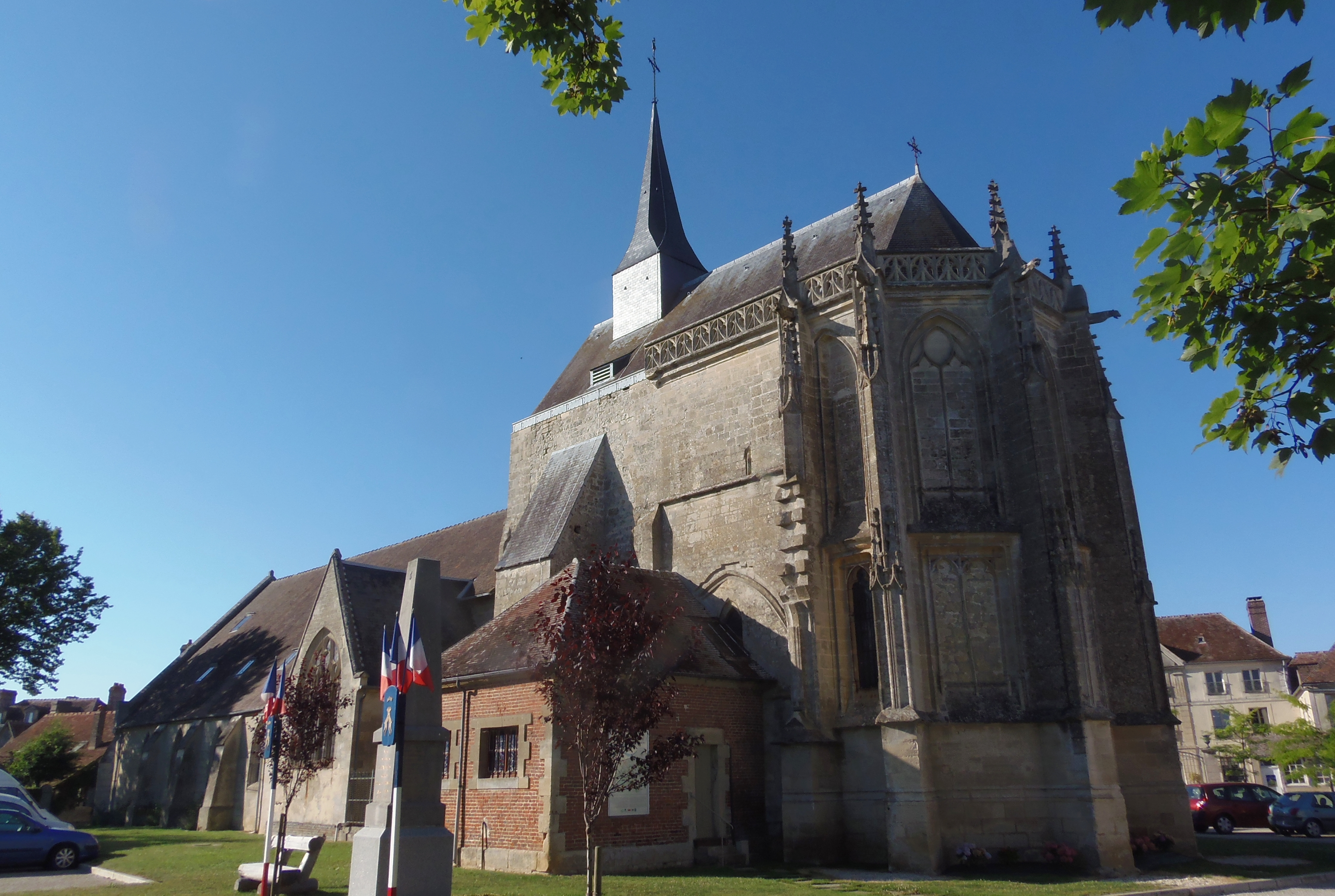
- Location of Gouffern en Auge
- Location within France Location within Normandy
- Coordinates: 48°45′18″N 0°04′08″E
- Country: France
- Region: Normandy
- Department: Orne
- Arrondissement: Argentan
- Canton: Argentan-2
- Intercommunality: Terres d'Argentan Interco

Government
  - Mayor (2020–2026): Philippe Toussaint
- Area^{1}: 165.79 km^{2} (64.01 sq mi)
- Population (2023): 3,636
  - Density: 21.93/km^{2} (56.80/sq mi)
- Time zone: UTC+01:00 (CET)
  - Summer (DST): UTC+02:00 (CEST)
- INSEE/Postal code: 61474 /61160, 61200, 61310
- ^{1} French Land Register data, which excludes lakes, ponds, glaciers > 1 km^{2} (0.386 sq mi or 247 acres) and river estuaries.

Gouffern en Auge (French pronunciation: [gufɛʁn ɑ̃.n‿oʒ], literally Gouffern in Auge) is a commune in the department of Orne, northwestern France. The municipality was established on 1 January 2017 by merger of the former communes of Silly-en-Gouffern (the seat), Aubry-en-Exmes, Avernes-sous-Exmes, Le Bourg-Saint-Léonard, Chambois, La Cochère, Courménil, Exmes, Fel, Omméel, Saint-Pierre-la-Rivière, Survie, Urou-et-Crennes and Villebadin.

== Geography ==
The commune is made up of the following collection of villages and hamlets: Survie, Saint-Pierre-la-Rivière, La Frênée, Omméel, Avernes-sous-Exmes, Fel, Aubry-en-Exmes, Villebadin, Chantereine, Courménil, Fougy, La Bélière, Le Bourg, Exmes, Le Bourg-Saint-Léonard, Silly-en-Gouffern, Urou-et-Crennes, Cayenne, La Cochère and Gouffern en Auge.

The commune is part of the area known as Pays d'Auge. Parts of the commune make up the area, the Plaine d'Argentan, which is known for its cereal growing fields and horse stud farms.

The Commune has three Natura 2000 protected areas which are shared with other communes the Bocages et vergers du sud Pays d'Auge, the Haute Vallée de la Touques et affluents and the Haute vallée de l'Orne et affluents.

Five rivers run through Gouffern en Auge: the Dives, the Dieuge, the Ure, the Vie and the Barges. The source of the Dives is in the commune at Exmes. In addition there are 20 streams that also traverse the commune:

1. Roule-Crottes
2. Etangs de Chagny
3. Heude
4. Pont aux Anes
5. Rogneux
6. Chedouit
7. Costillets
8. Fontaines Thiot
9. Foulbec
10. Noës
11. Haies Cosnard
12. Douaires
13. Pont de Barges
14. Querpont
15. Val Roger
16. l'Etang des Genets
17. Courgeron
18. Joncerai
19. Moulin a Tan
20. Mont-Ormel

== Population ==
Population data refer to the area corresponding with the commune as of January 2025.

Historical population
Year	Pop.	±% p.a.
1968	4,072	—
1975	3,823	−0.90%
1982	3,830	+0.03%
1990	3,907	+0.25%
1999	3,706	−0.59%
2007	3,738	+0.11%
2012	3,872	+0.71%
2017	3,729	−0.75%
2023	3,636	−0.42%
Source: INSEE

== Points of Interest ==
- Hippodrome du pays d'Argentan is a racecourse for horse racing, based in Urou-et-Crennes.
- Forest of Gouffern is a 4120 Hectare Forest that is split into two parts by the River Ure, Petite Gouffern to the south of the river and Grande Gouffern to the North.
- Le coteau de la Butte is a Sensitive Natural Space of Orne, in Courménil. It is a 4 Hectare reserve, which you can observe its flagship species of Dactylorhiza viridis, Neotinea ustulata and Marsh fritillary.
- Carrière de la Tourelle is a 2-hectare site in Aubry-en-Exmes classed as a Sensitive Natural Space of Orne. The site was created in 1987, and features fauna and flora such as dropwort, round-headed rampion and the Adonis blue butterfly.

=== National heritage sites ===
The commune has 12 buildings and areas listed as monument historiques

- Château du Bourg-Saint-Léonard, an 18th-century chateau listed as a monument in 1942 in 1954 it was bequeathed to the local municipality. The Chateau and its grounds are open to the public.
- Donjon de Chambois, a former medieval dungeon built in the 12th century, by William de Mandeville. It was registered as a monument historique in 1901.
- Château d'Exmes, the remains of a tenth-century castle listed as a monument in 1979
- Château de Villebadin, a 17th-century chateau listed as a monument in 1978
- Château d’Aubry-en-Exmes, a 14th-century chateau listed as a monument in 1968
- Château de Courménil, an 18th-century chateau listed as a monument in 1991
- Manor of Argentelles, a 15th-century manor house listed as a monument in 1926. Henry IV of France stayed here in 1591.
- Chateau de la Roche, an 18th-century chateau listed as a monument in 1974.
- Saint-André Church, an 11th-century church in Exmes listed as a monument in 1913
- Fougy Church, a 12th-century church in Le Bourg-Saint-Léonard listed as a monument in 1971
- Saint-Martins Church, 12th-century church, that apart from Sées Cathedral is the only stone spire to have been built before the 15th century in Orne. Registered as a monument in 1914.
- Pierre Levée Menhir, a Neolithic Menhir that was classed as a Monument historique in 1889.
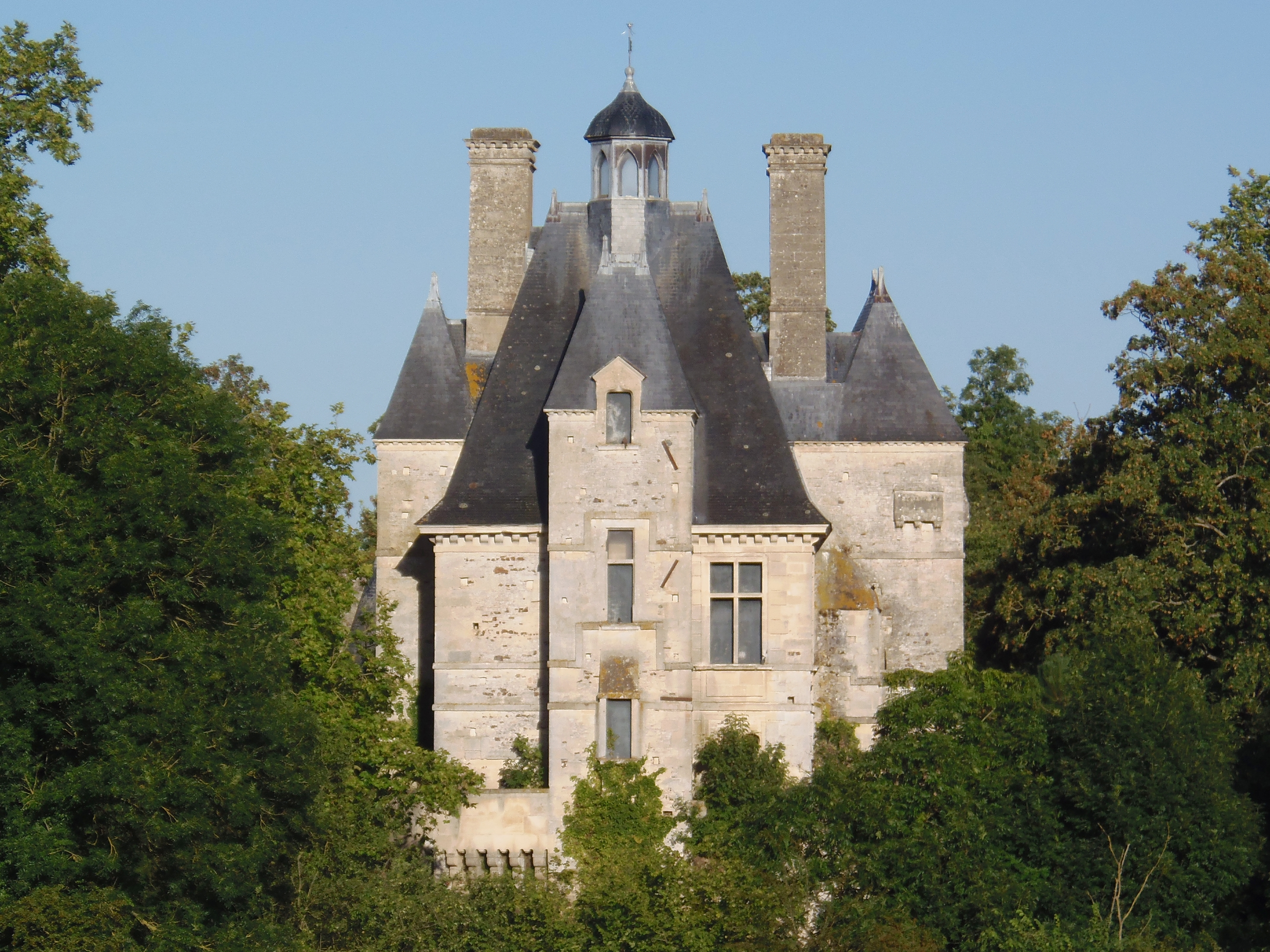
Aubry and Exmes Chateau

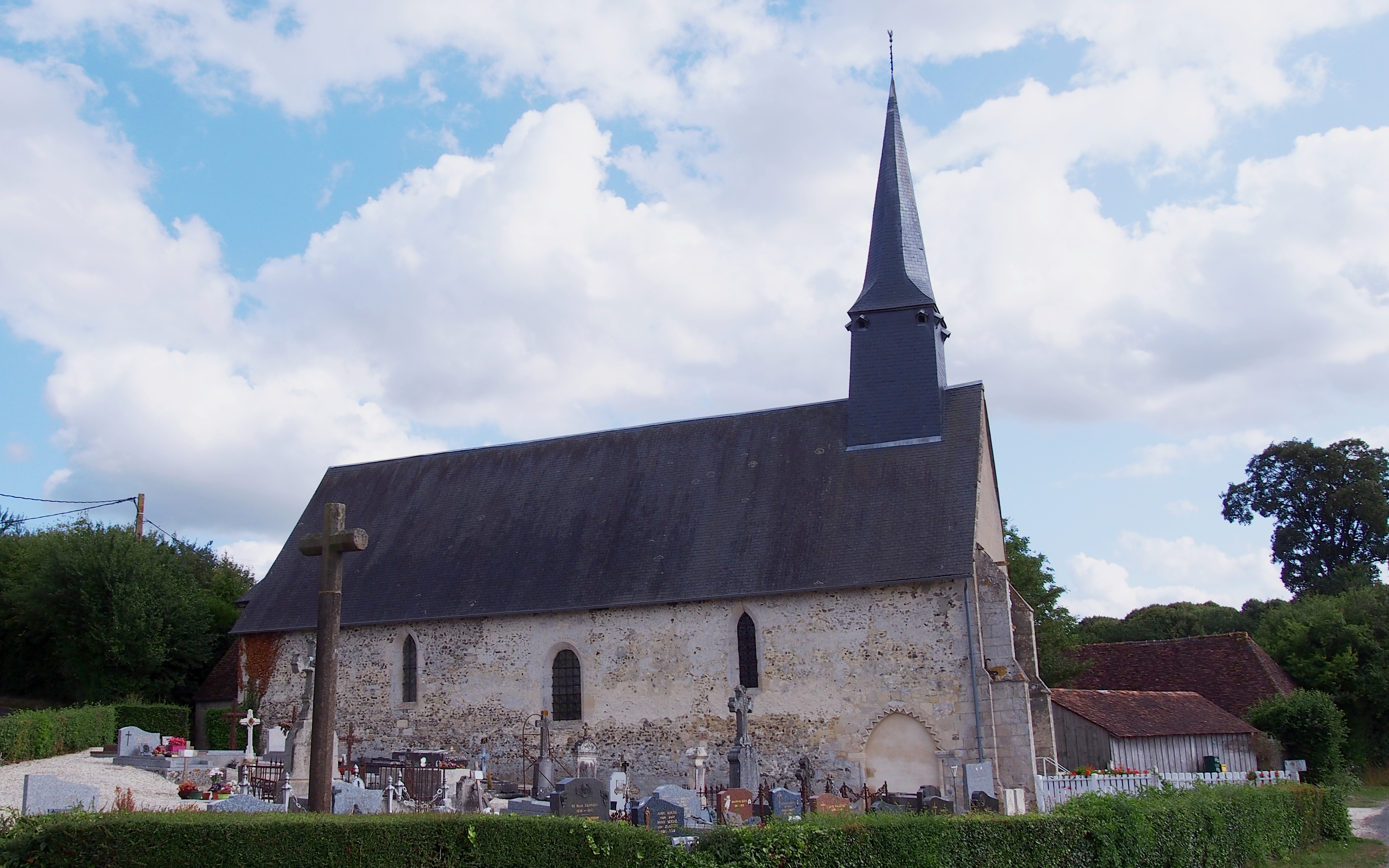
Avernes-sous-Exmes. Saint-Léger church

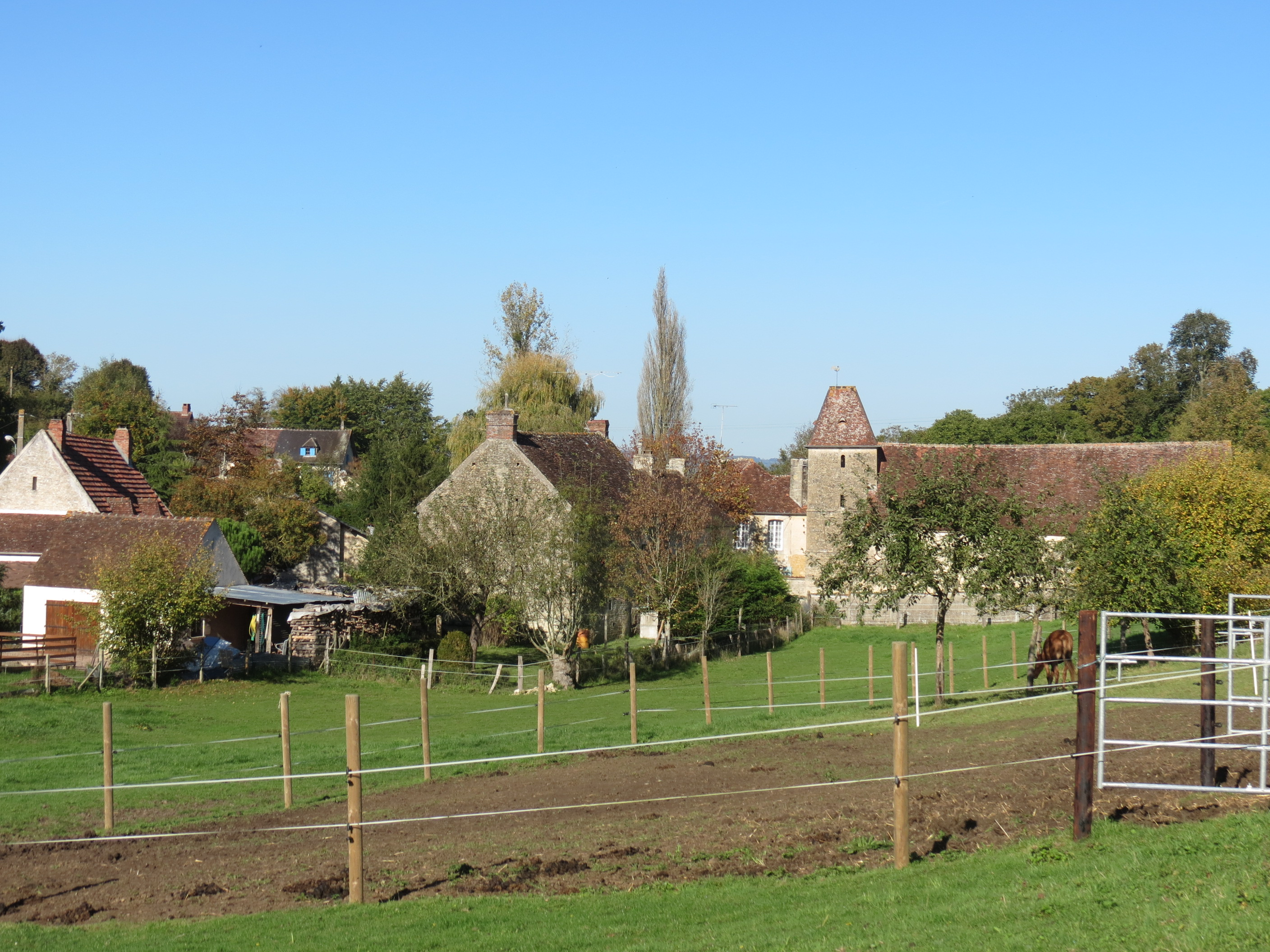
Bourg St Leonard

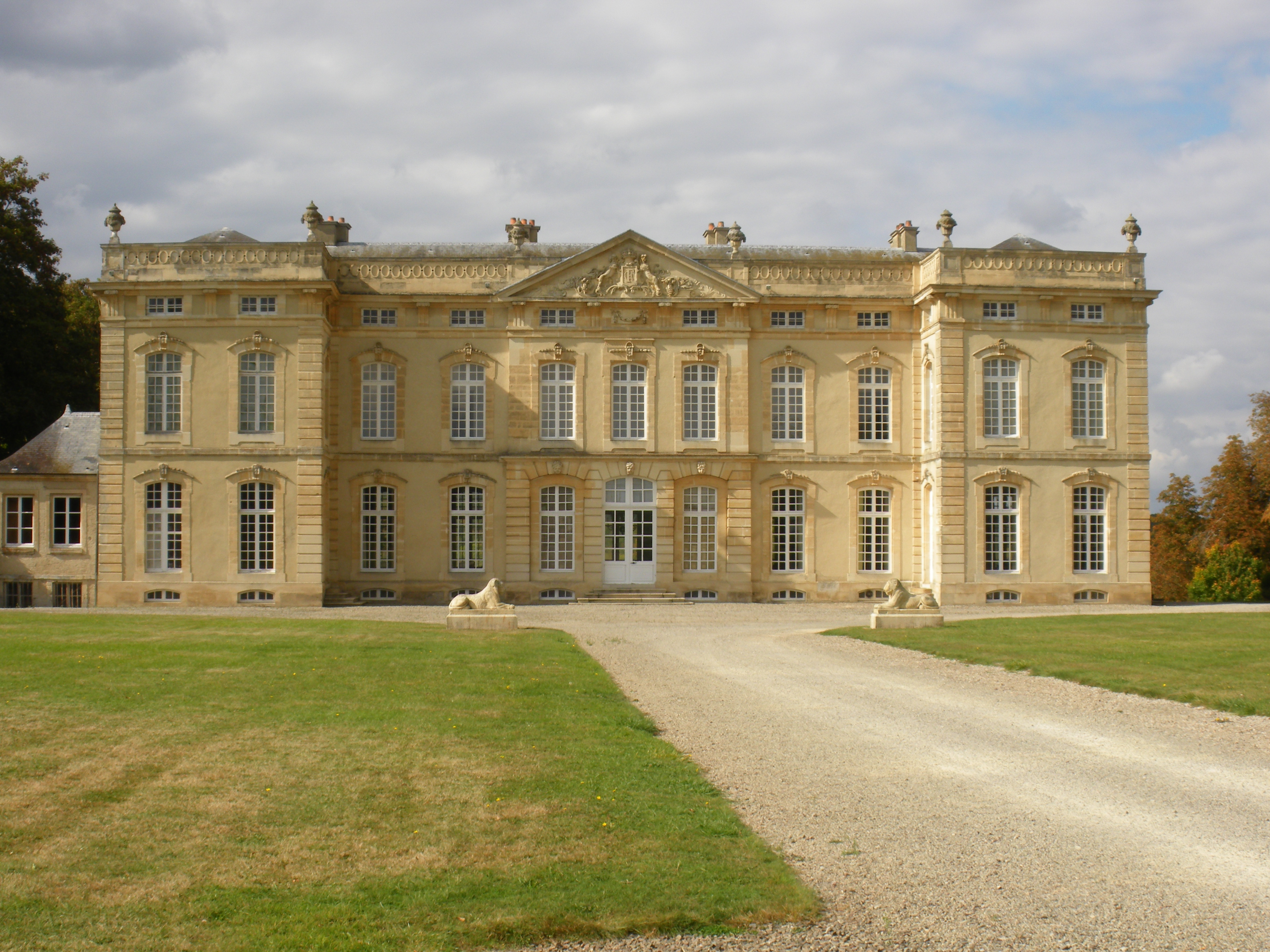
Chateau Bourg St Leonard

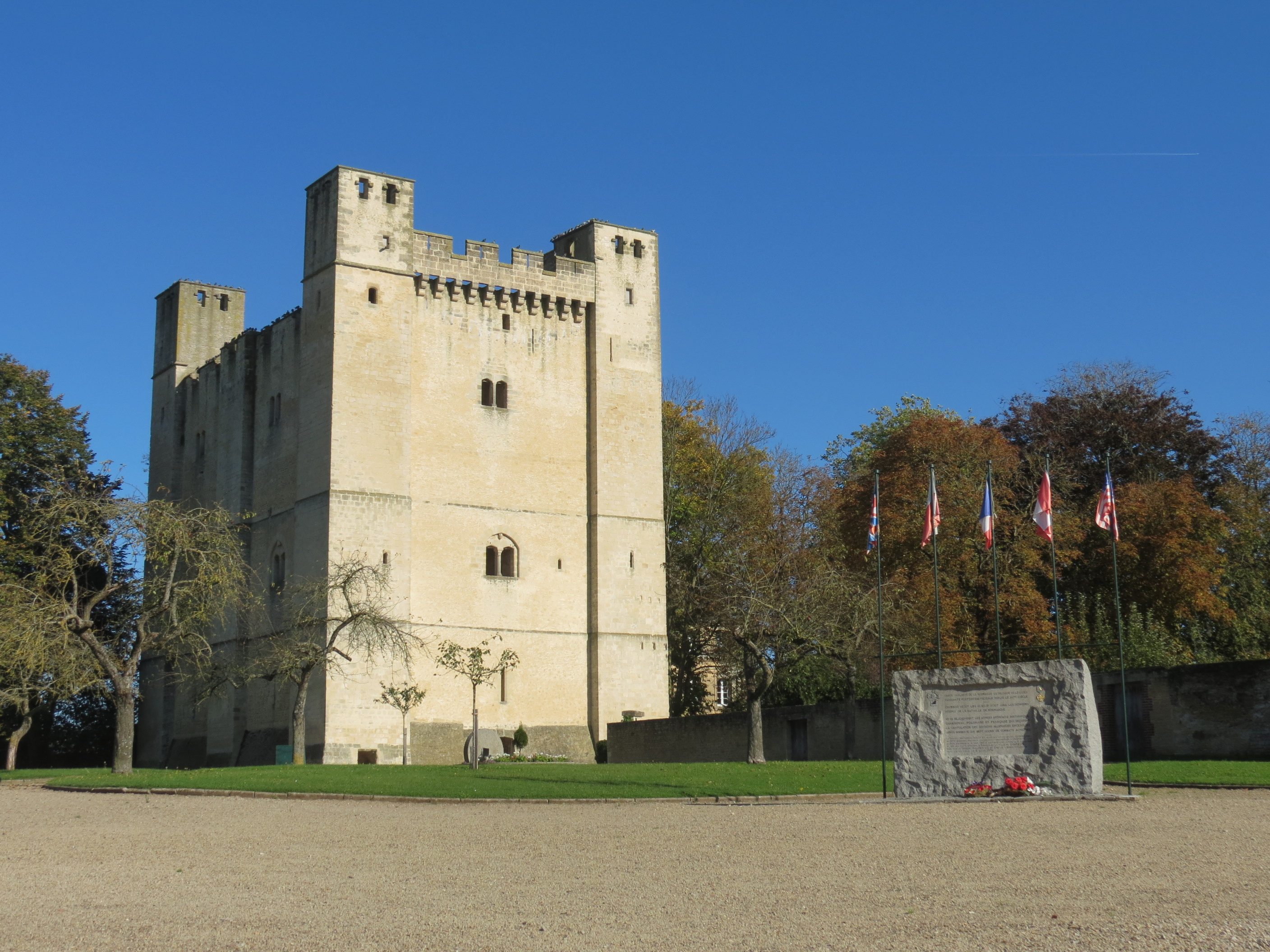
Chambois

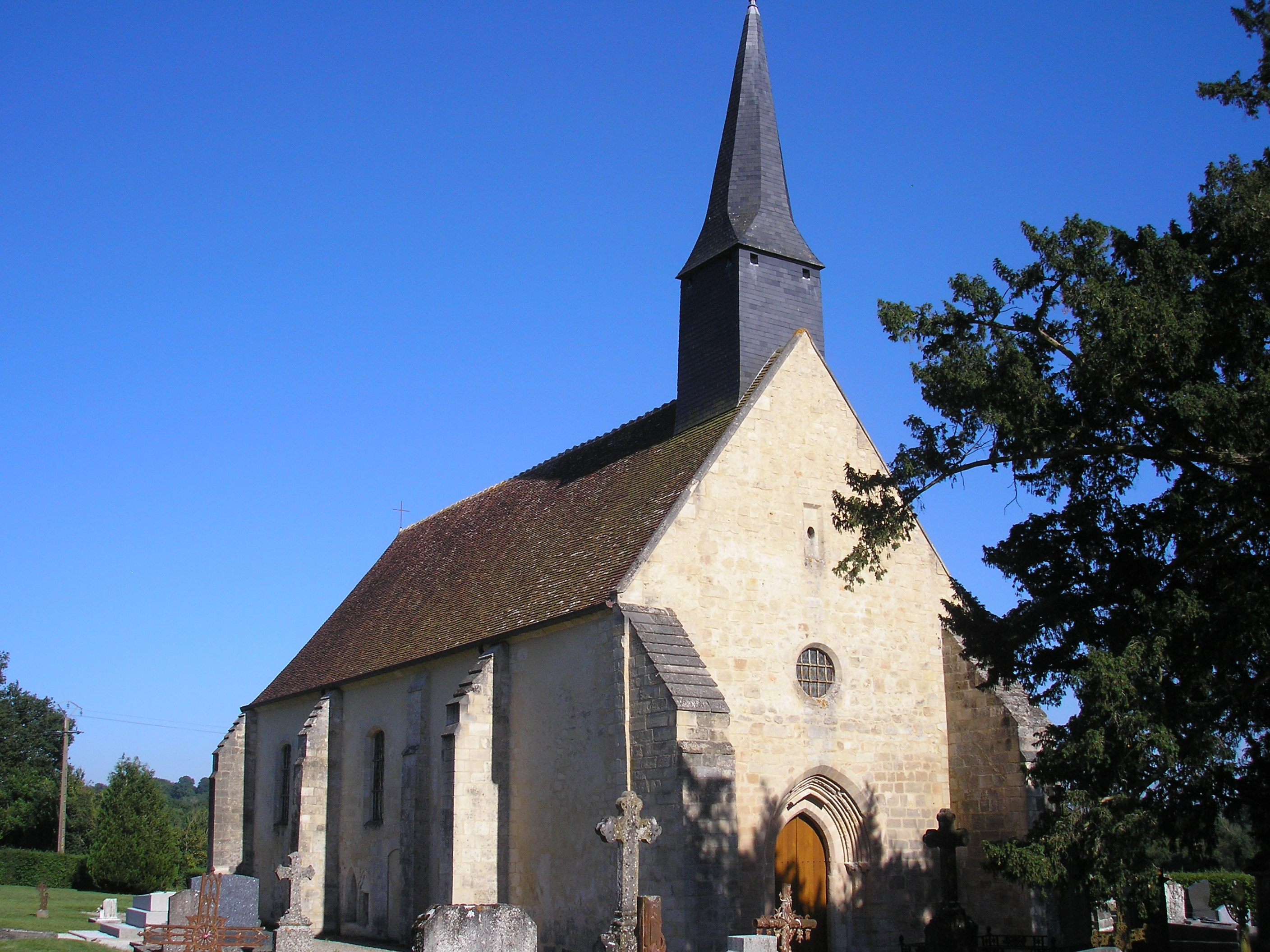
La Cochère. The Church of Saint-Sauveur

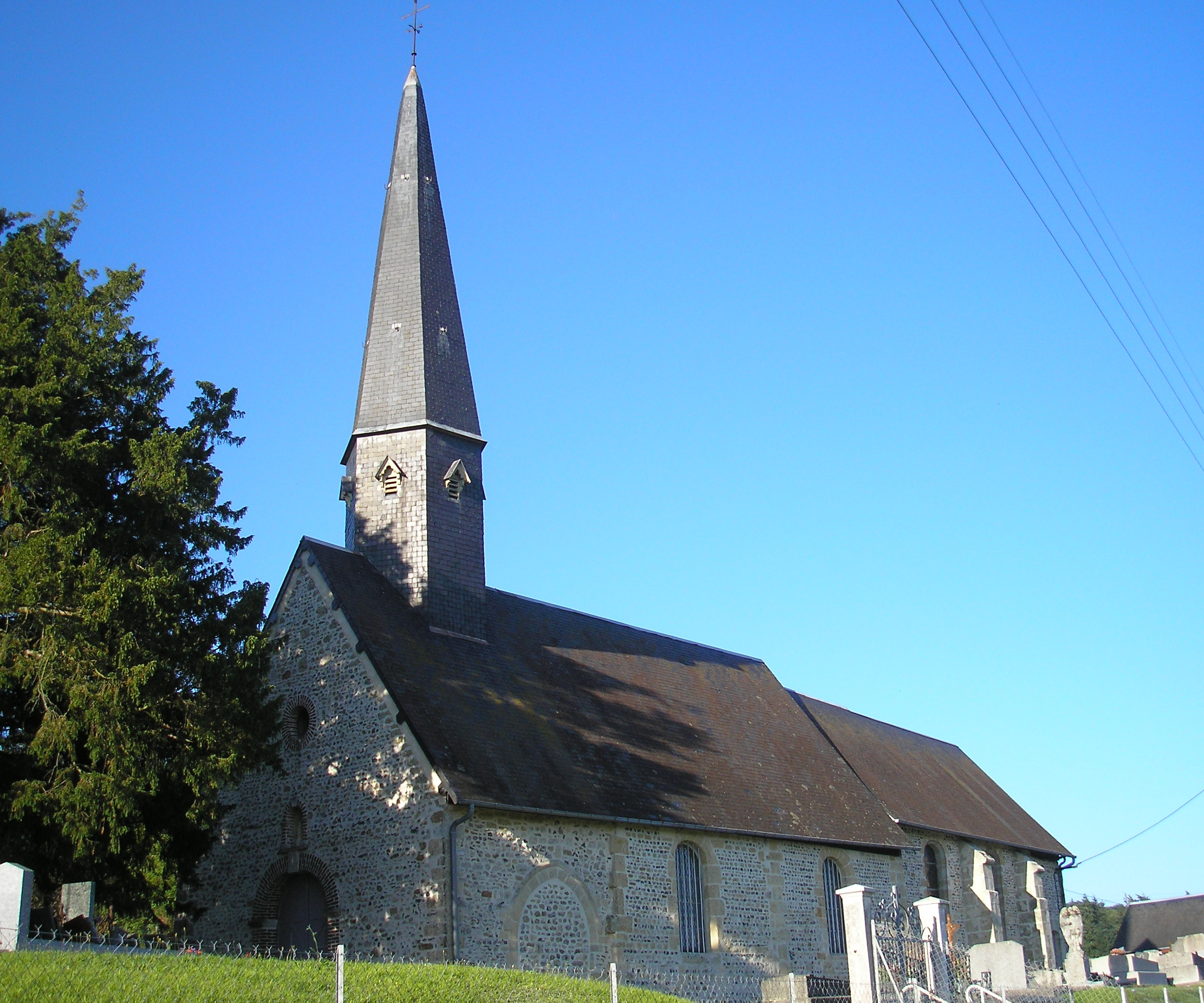
Courménil. Notre Dame Church

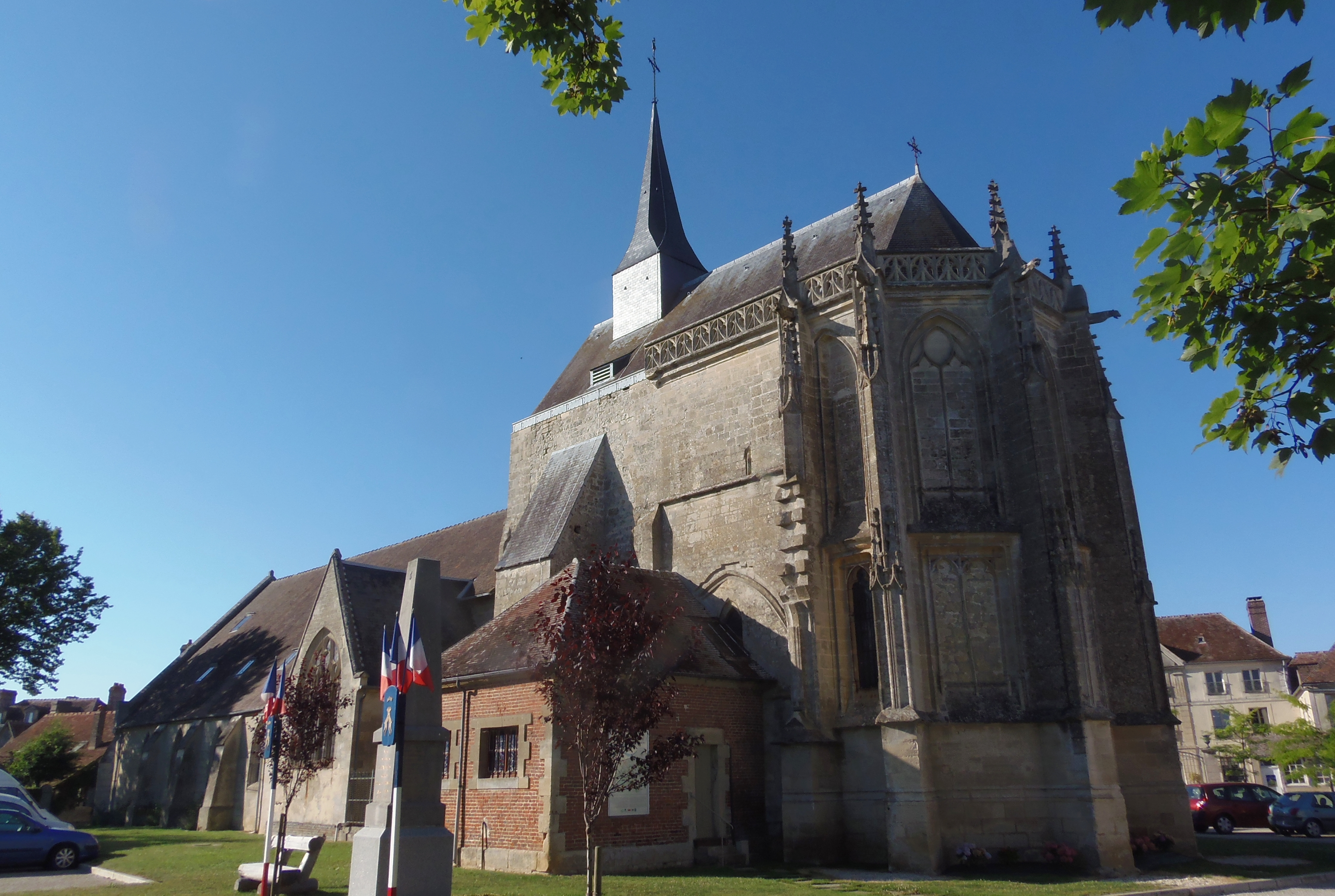
Exmes. Saint Andrew's Church

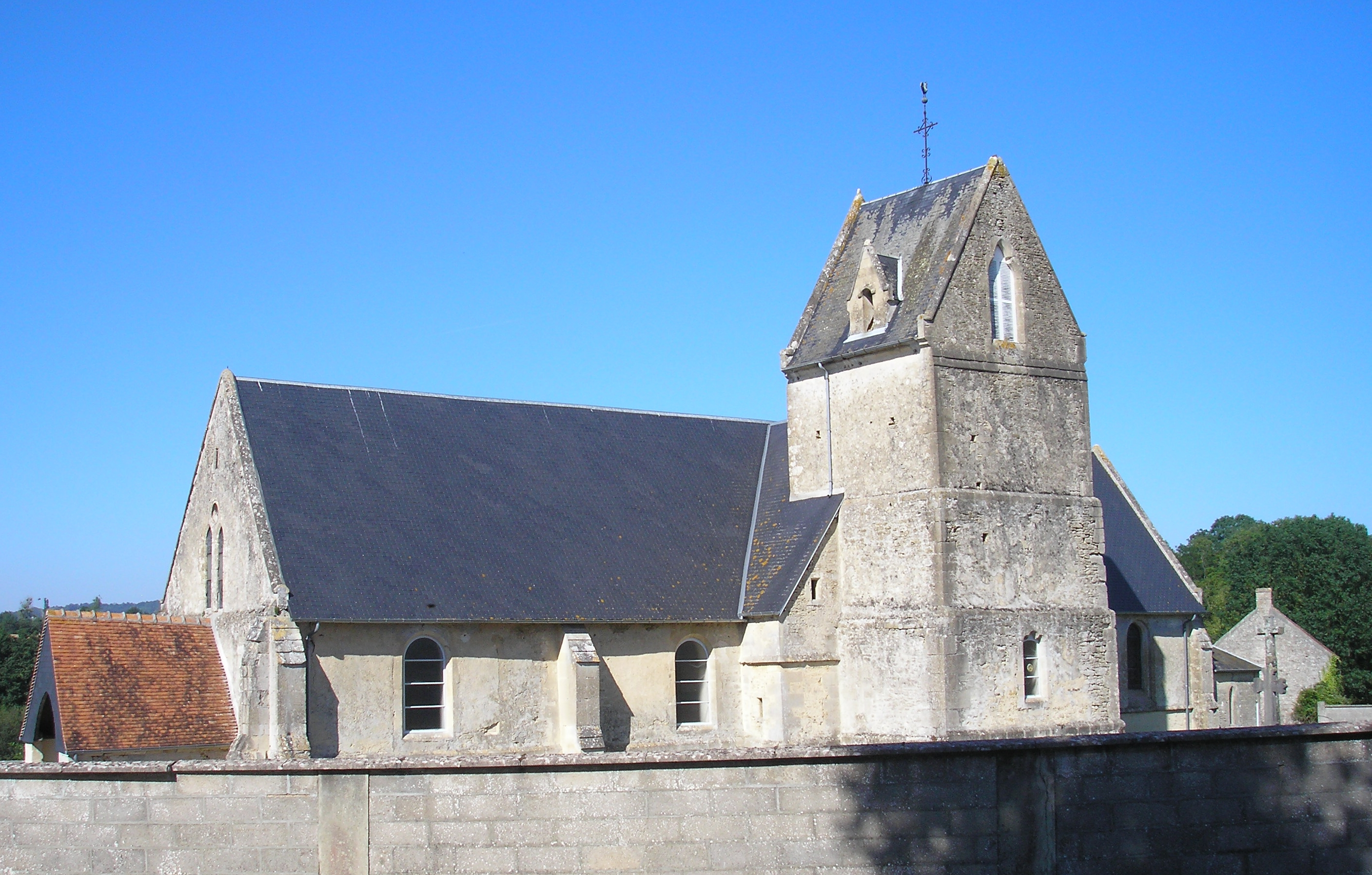
Fel. Saint-Medard church

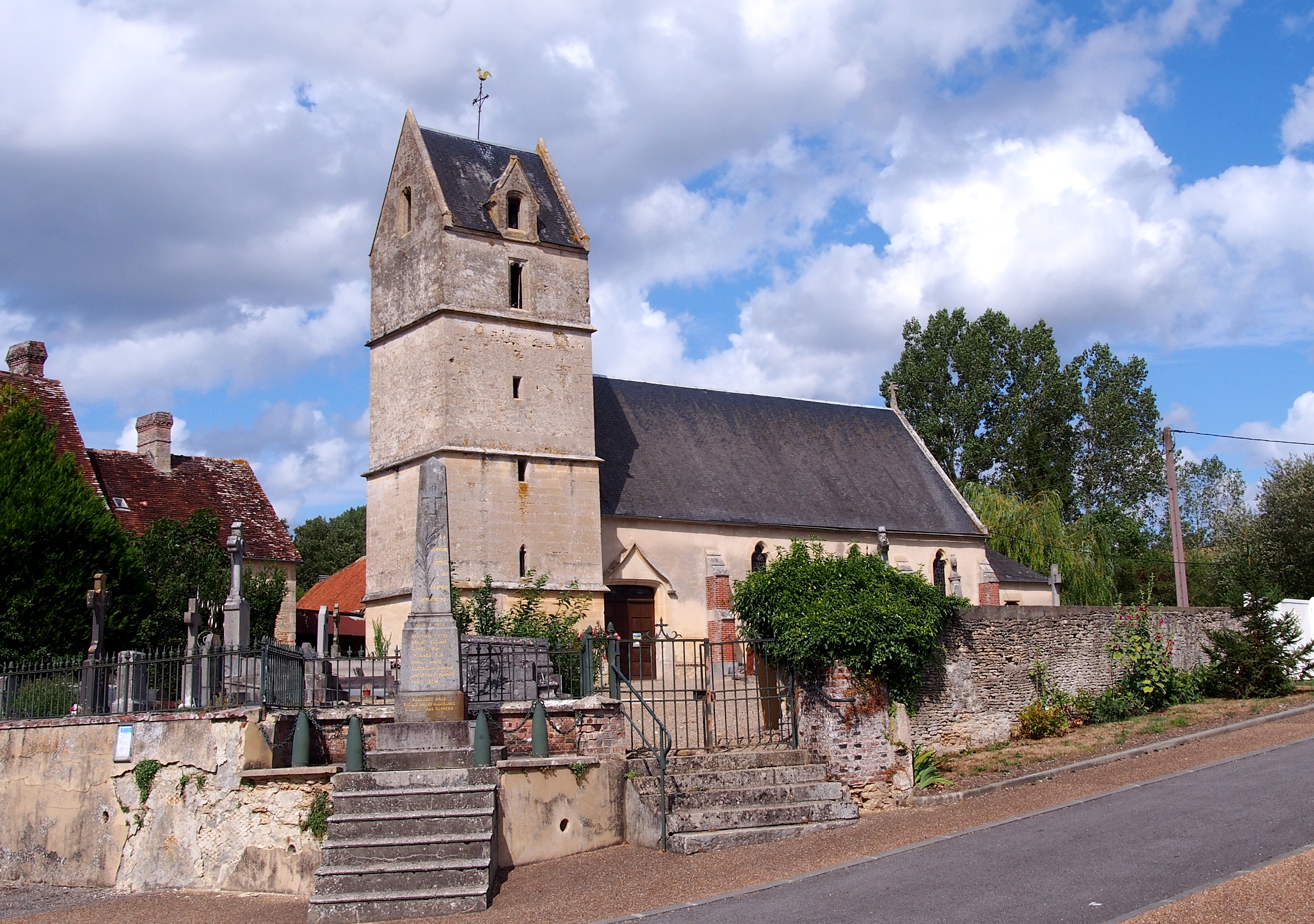
Omméel. Saint Peter's Church

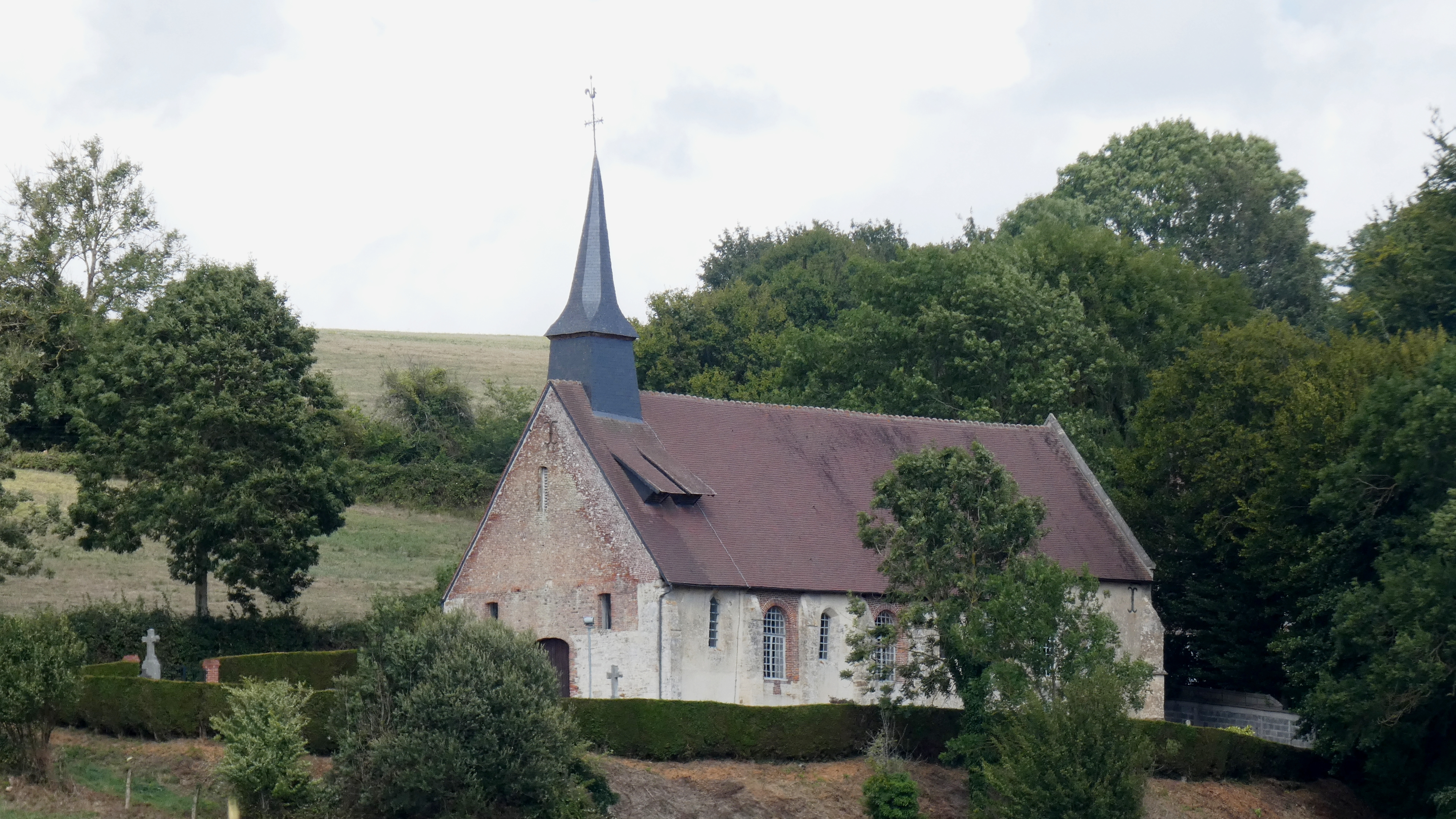
Saint-Pierre-la-Rivière. Saint Peter's Church

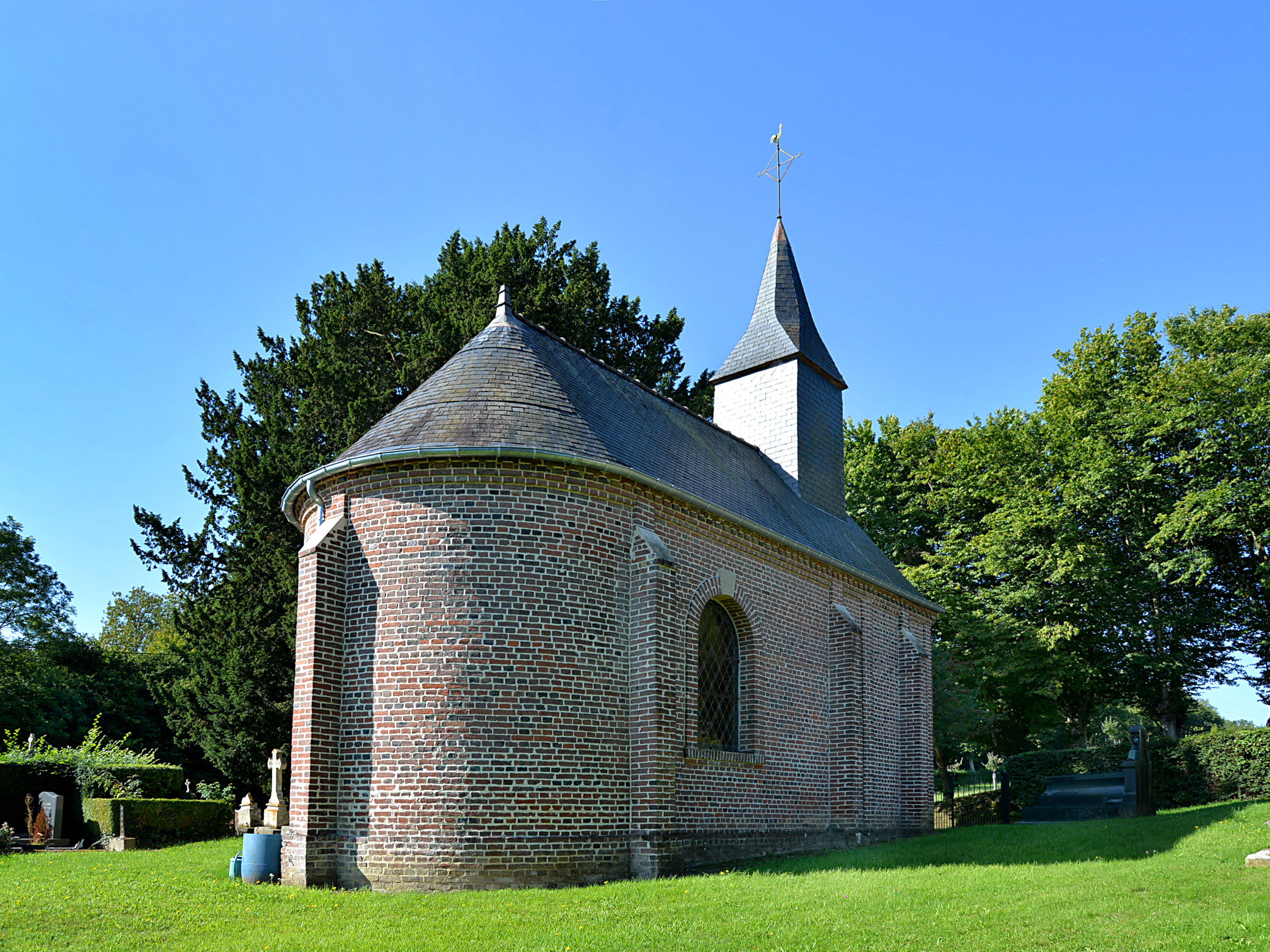
Saint-Malo chapel of Belhôtel, Survie

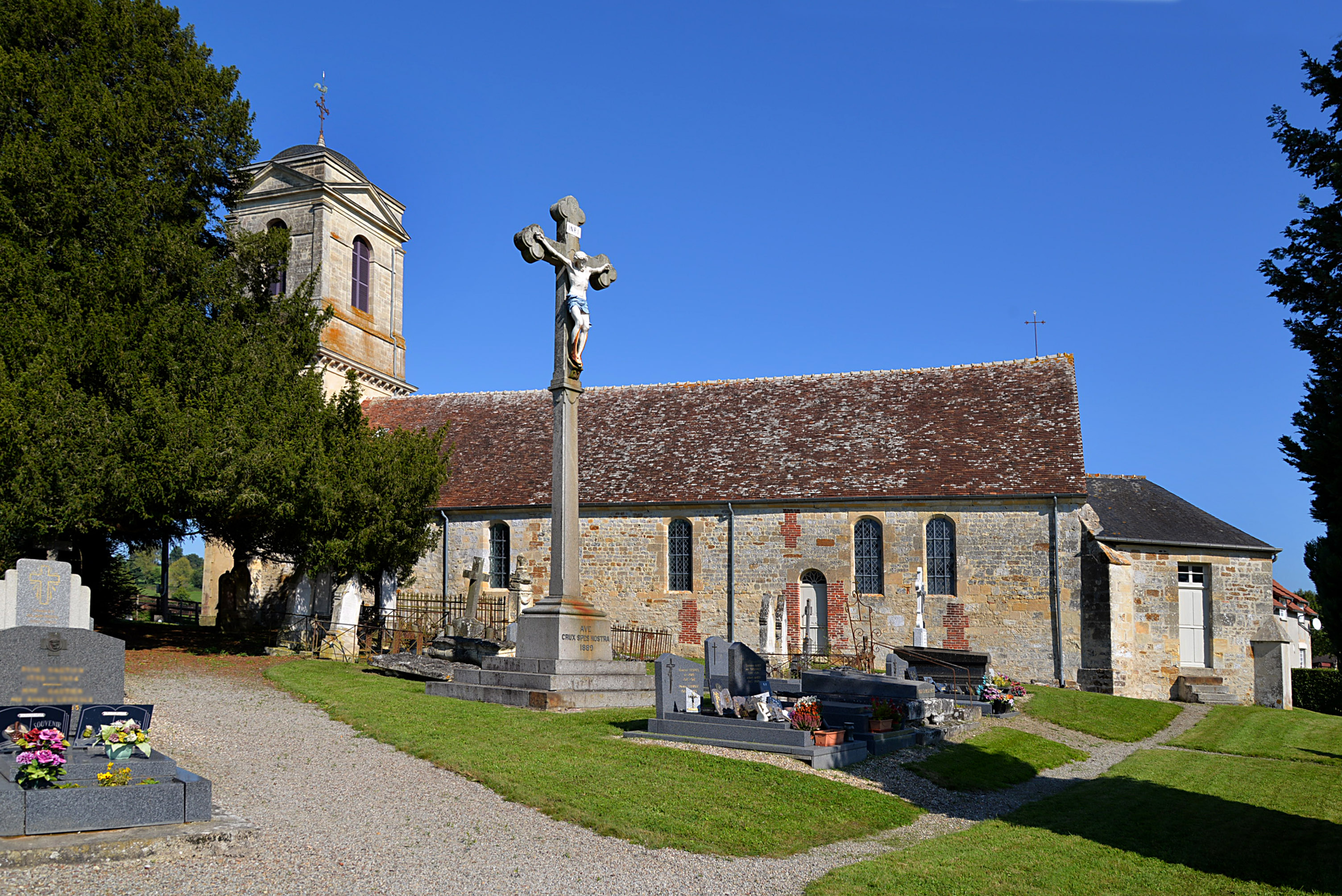
Church of Saint-Martin de Survie

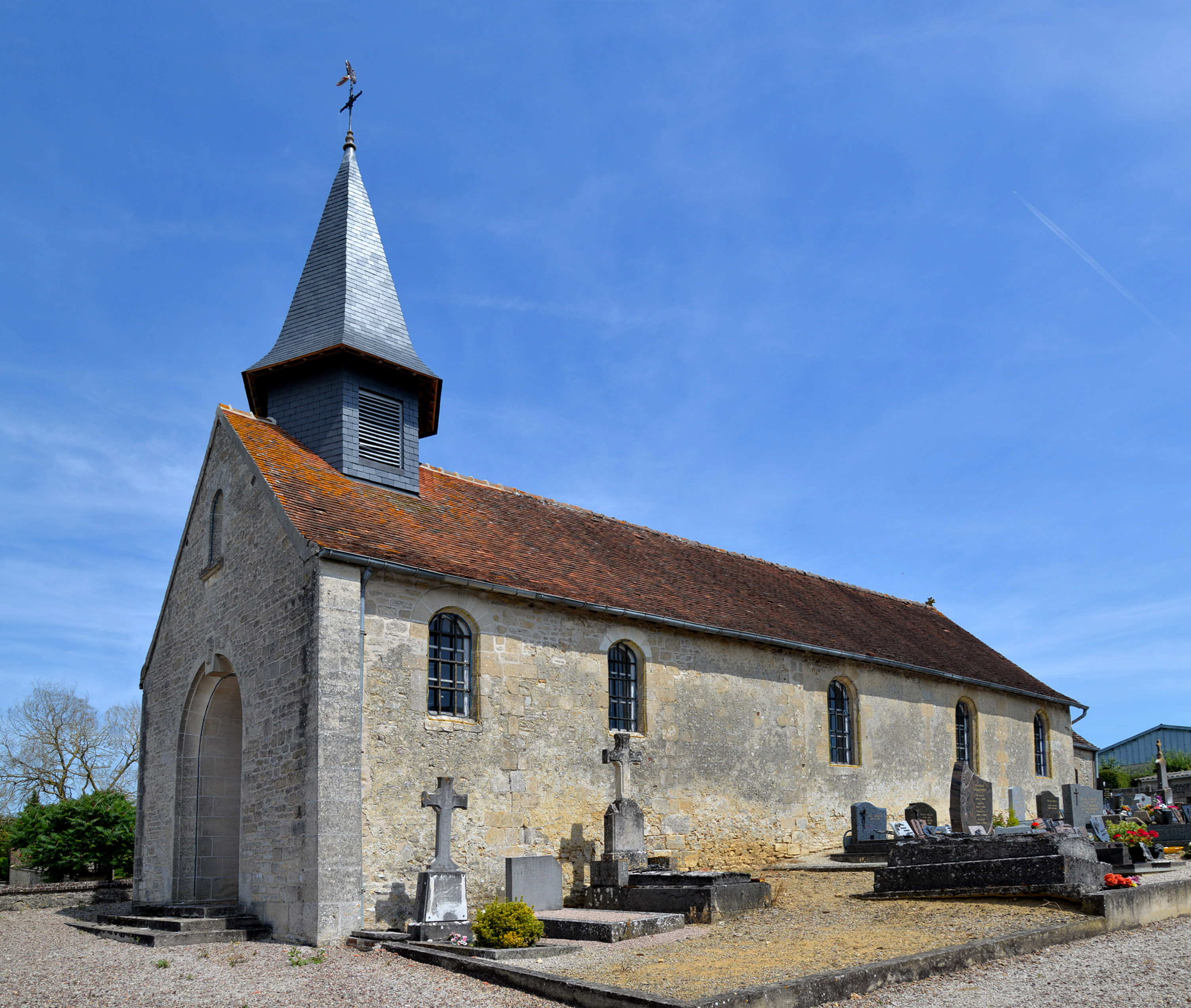
Church of Our Lady of Sorrows of Urou-et-Crennes

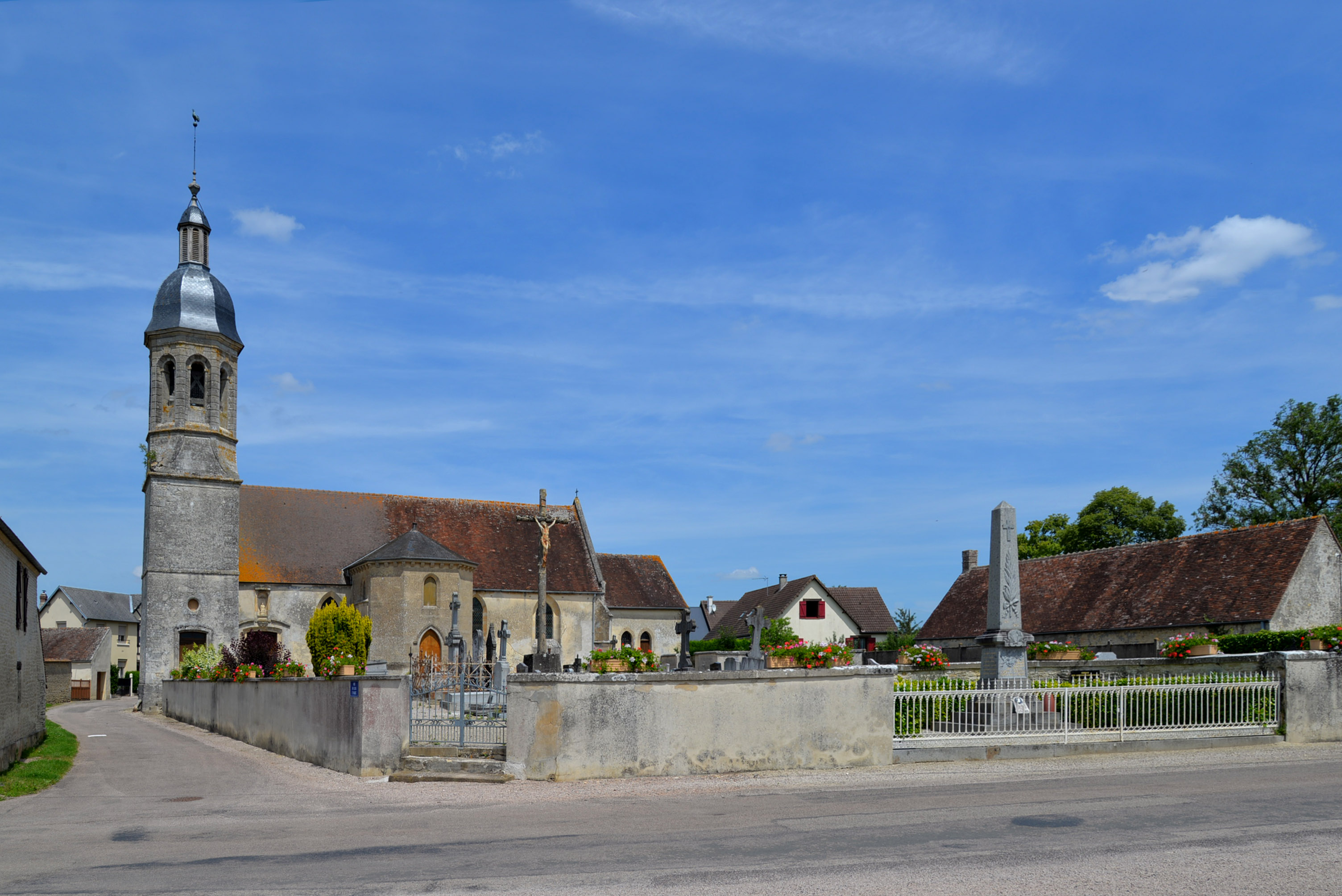
Church of Our Lady of the Nativity of Urou-et-Crennes

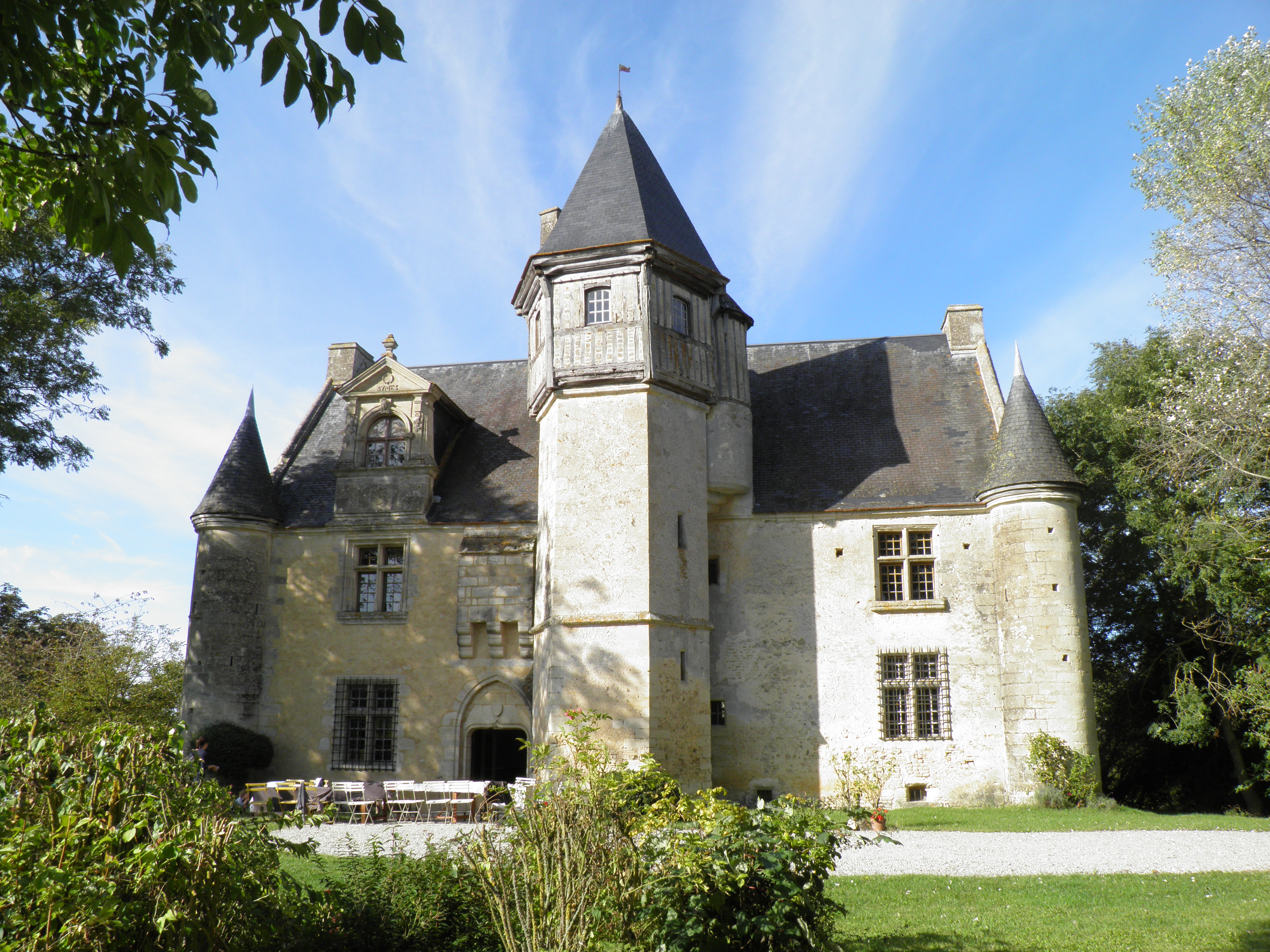
Manor of Argentelles Villebadin

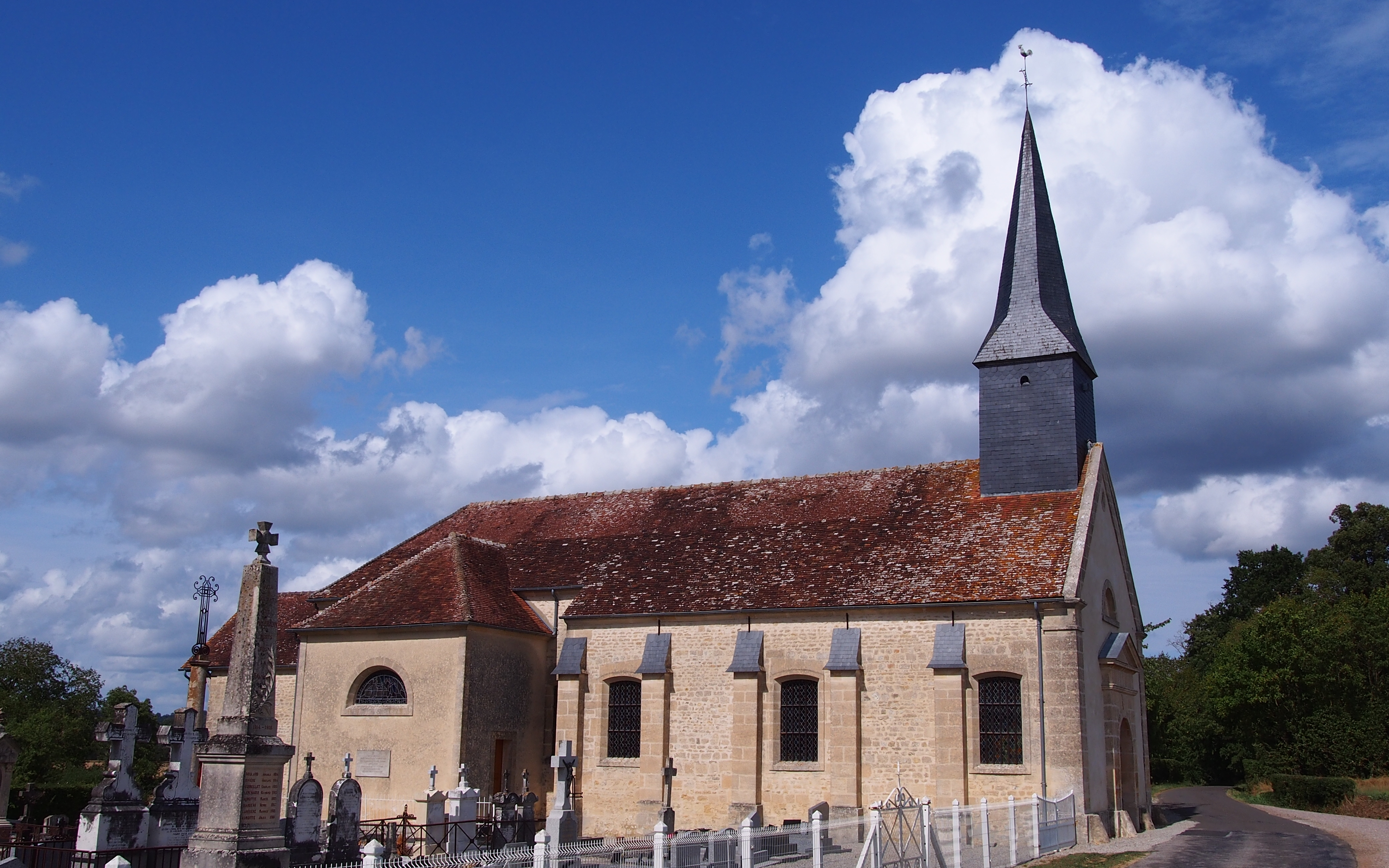
Villebadin. The Saint-Jean-Baptiste church

== Notable people ==
- Opportuna of Montreuil (died 770), a Frankish Benedictine nun and abbess who was born here.
- Herbert de Losinga (died 1119), the first Bishop of Norwich was born here.
- François Le Prévost d'Exmes (1729-1793), a French writer, playwright and literary critic who was born here.
- Marie Louis Descorches (1749-1830), a French diplomat was born here.
- Martin-Guillaume Biennais (1764-1843), a French Gold and Silversmith was born here.
- Victor Paysant (1841-1921) a priest who created The living and talking church of Ménil-Gondouin was born here.
- Léon Bazalgette (1873-1928), a French literary critic, biographer and translator lived and was buried here.

== See also ==
- Communes of the Orne department
