= Le Pin-au-Haras =

- Commune
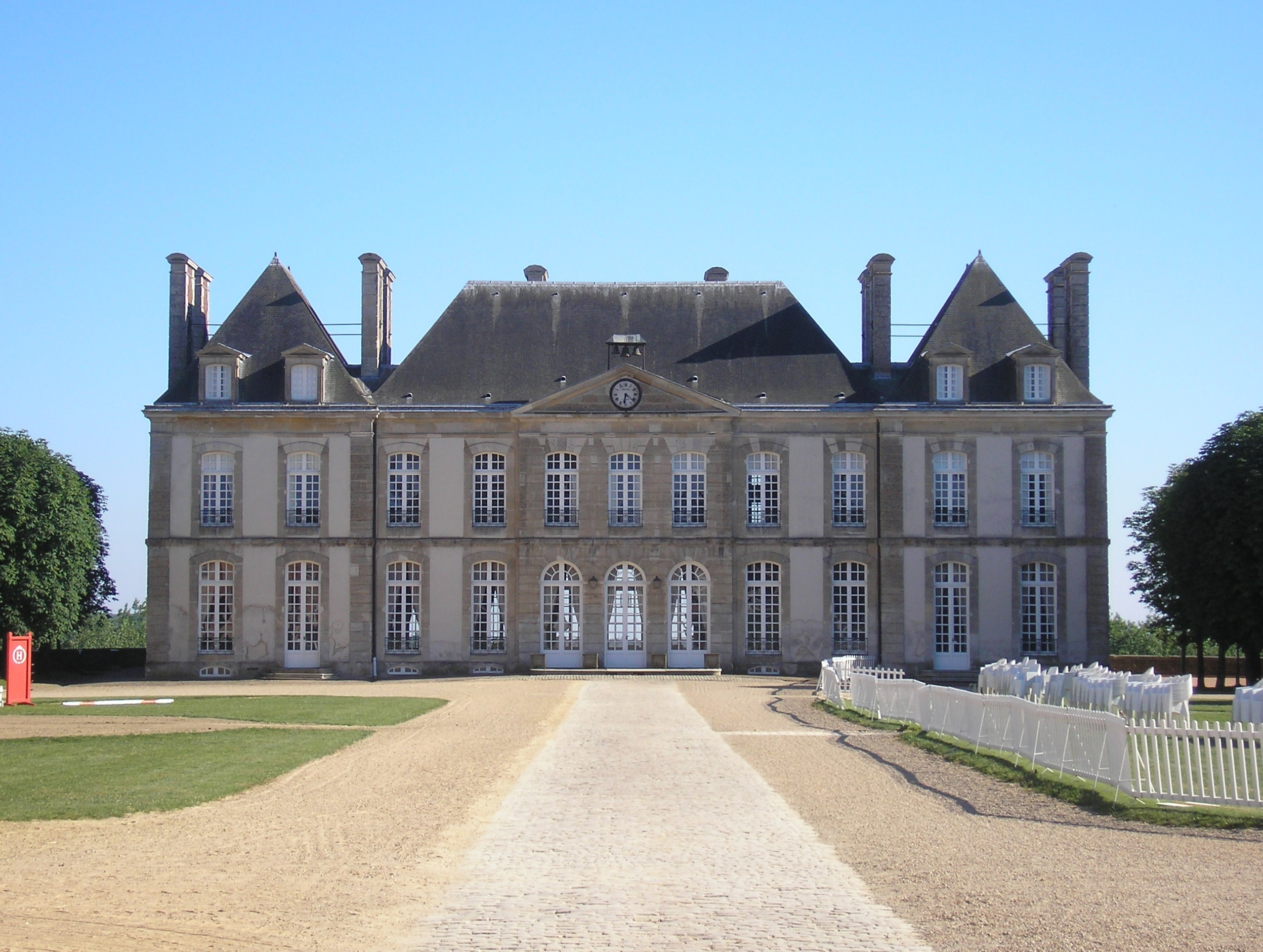
- The chateau in Le Pin-au-Haras
- Location of Le Pin-au-Haras
- Location within France Location within Normandy
- Coordinates: 48°44′44″N 0°08′34″E
- Country: France
- Region: Normandy
- Department: Orne
- Arrondissement: Argentan
- Canton: Argentan-2
- Intercommunality: Terres d'Argentan Interco

Government
  - Mayor (2020–2026): Christophe Beucher
- Area^{1}: 8.66 km^{2} (3.34 sq mi)
- Elevation: 240 m (790 ft)
- Highest elevation: 248 m (814 ft)
- Lowest elevation: 140 m (460 ft)
- Population (2023): 243
  - Density: 28.1/km^{2} (72.7/sq mi)
- Time zone: UTC+01:00 (CET)
  - Summer (DST): UTC+02:00 (CEST)
- INSEE/Postal code: 61328 /61310
- ^{1} French Land Register data, which excludes lakes, ponds, glaciers > 1 km^{2} (0.386 sq mi or 247 acres) and river estuaries.

Le Pin-au-Haras (French pronunciation: [lə pɛ̃ o aʁa]) is a commune in the Orne department in north-western France.

== Geography ==
The commune is made up of the following collection of villages and hamlets, La Lune, La Gautellerie, Courgeron, La Hamelinière, La Frênaie, Le Haras du Pin and Le Pin-au-Haras.

The Commune is one of 27 communes that make up the Natura 2000 protected area of Bocages et vergers du sud Pays d'Auge.

The commune has the river Ure running through it and five streams, the Etang des Genets, Etangs de Chagny, Chedouit, Pont de Barges & the Courgeron.

The commune is completely enclosed within the commune of Gouffern en Auge.

=== Climate ===
Le Pin-au-Haras's Climate is classed as a temperate oceanic climate according to the Köppen–Geiger climate classification.

Climate data for Le Pin-au-Haras, 1991–2021 normals, elevation: 202 m (663 ft), extremes 1968–present, 1991 - 2019 Average sun hours
Month	Jan	Feb	Mar	Apr	May	Jun	Jul	Aug	Sep	Oct	Nov	Dec	Year
Record high °C (°F)	17.2 (63.0)	19.5 (67.1)	23.2 (73.8)	26.9 (80.4)	30 (86)	34.9 (94.8)	38.3 (100.9)	37.2 (99.0)	32.5 (90.5)	27.8 (82.0)	21.1 (70.0)	15.9 (60.6)	38.3 (100.9)
Mean daily maximum °C (°F)	7.3 (45.1)	8.3 (46.9)	11.6 (52.9)	14.7 (58.5)	18 (64)	21.4 (70.5)	23.6 (74.5)	23.6 (74.5)	20.3 (68.5)	15.6 (60.1)	10.8 (51.4)	7.8 (46.0)	15.3 (59.5)
Daily mean °C (°F)	4.3 (39.7)	4.6 (40.3)	7.1 (44.8)	9.3 (48.7)	12.7 (54.9)	15.8 (60.4)	17.7 (63.9)	17.7 (63.9)	14.7 (58.5)	11.3 (52.3)	7.4 (45.3)	4.7 (40.5)	10.6 (51.1)
Mean daily minimum °C (°F)	1.2 (34.2)	0.8 (33.4)	2.5 (36.5)	3.9 (39.0)	7.4 (45.3)	10.3 (50.5)	11.9 (53.4)	11.8 (53.2)	9.1 (48.4)	7.1 (44.8)	4 (39)	1.6 (34.9)	6 (43)
Record low °C (°F)	−27.5 (−17.5)	−16 (3)	−12 (10)	−7.1 (19.2)	−4 (25)	−2.2 (28.0)	1.8 (35.2)	−0.7 (30.7)	−2.5 (27.5)	−8 (18)	−10 (14)	−14 (7)	−27.5 (−17.5)
Average precipitation mm (inches)	66.7 (2.63)	56.1 (2.21)	55.3 (2.18)	55.9 (2.20)	66.7 (2.63)	54 (2.1)	58.9 (2.32)	58.1 (2.29)	53.9 (2.12)	73.7 (2.90)	75.4 (2.97)	81.6 (3.21)	756.3 (29.78)
Average precipitation days (≥ 1.0 mm)	12.7	11.5	11.3	10.7	9.6	8.7	8.2	9.2	9	12.5	13.8	14.4	131.5
Average relative humidity (%)	87	83	79	74	74	71	70	72	76	82	88	87	79
Mean monthly sunshine hours	83.7	103.6	161.2	213	229.4	252	263.5	241.8	195	142.6	99	93	2,077.8
Source 1: Météo France
Source 2: Climate data (relative humidity & Average Sunshine hours)

== Notable buildings and places ==
=== National heritage sites ===
Haras national du Pin is the national and oldest Stud farm of France, and considered the Versailles for horses. It was created by Louis XIV and built in the 1700s. It is now a tourist attraction and was listed as a Monument historique in 1948.

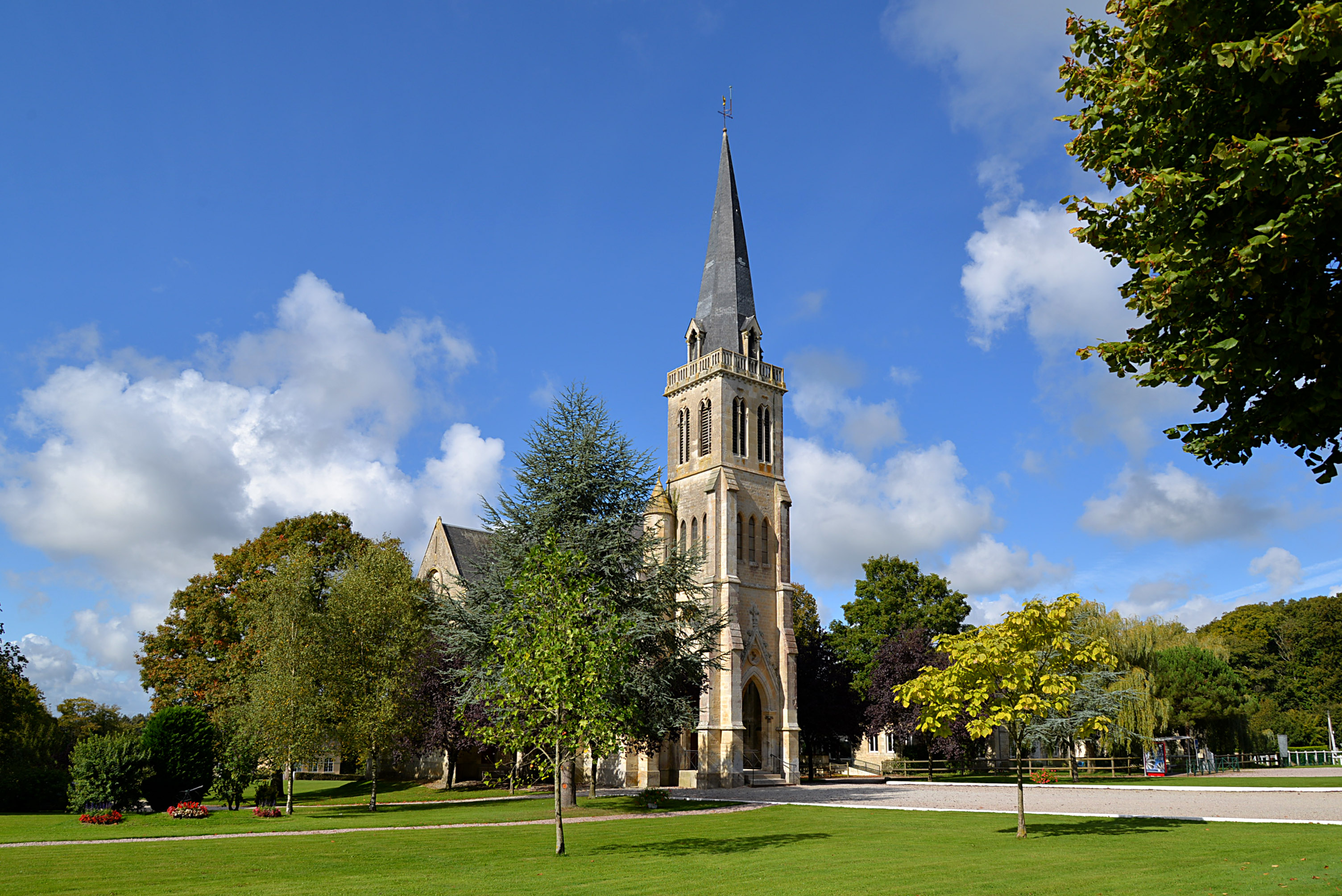
Église Notre-Dame de l'Assomption du Pin-au-Haras.

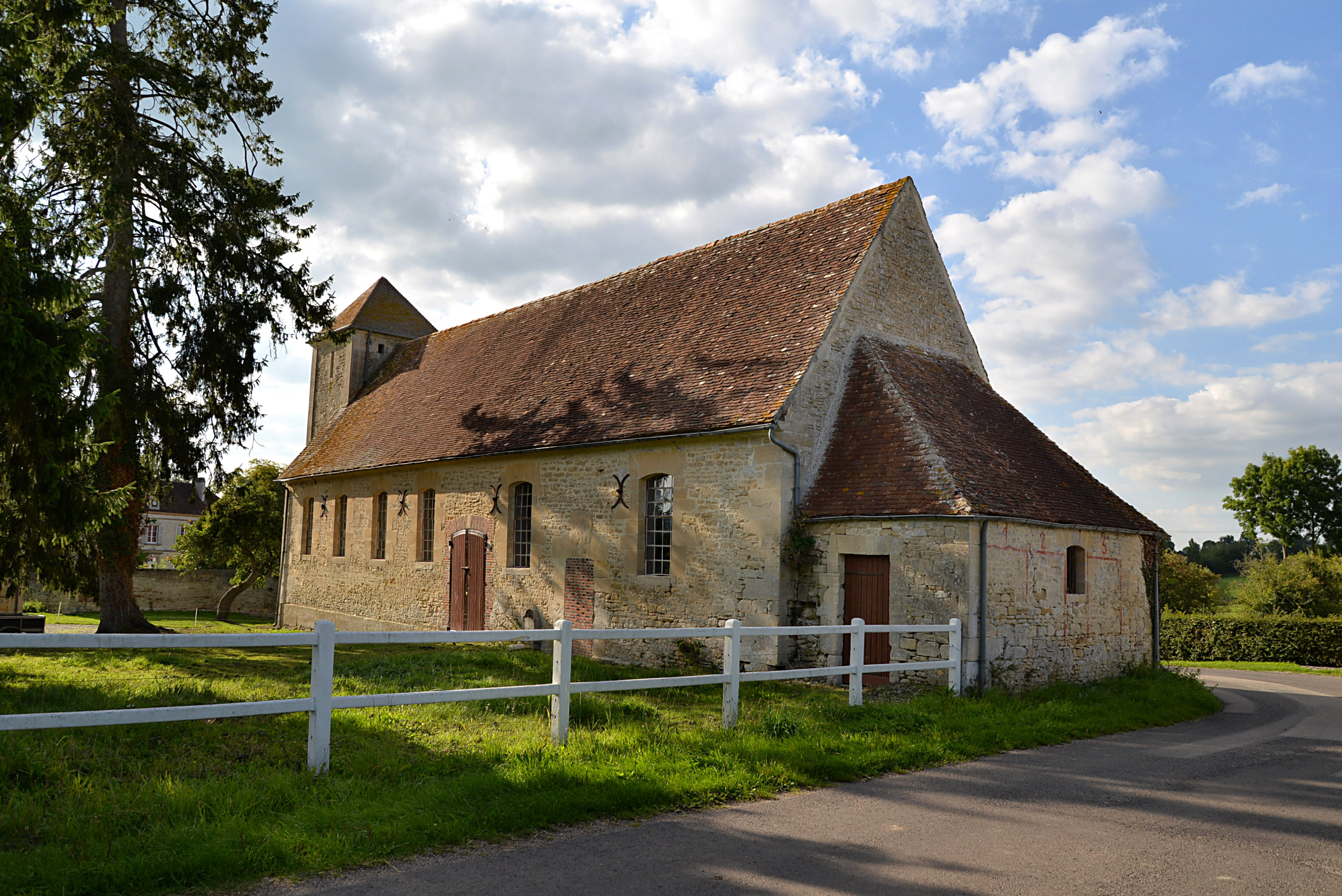
Ancienne église Saint-Ouen (Le Vieux Pin) du Pin-au-Haras

== See also ==
- Communes of the Orne department
