= Napoleonic Tureen (Metropolitan Museum of Art) =

Silver-gilt tureen

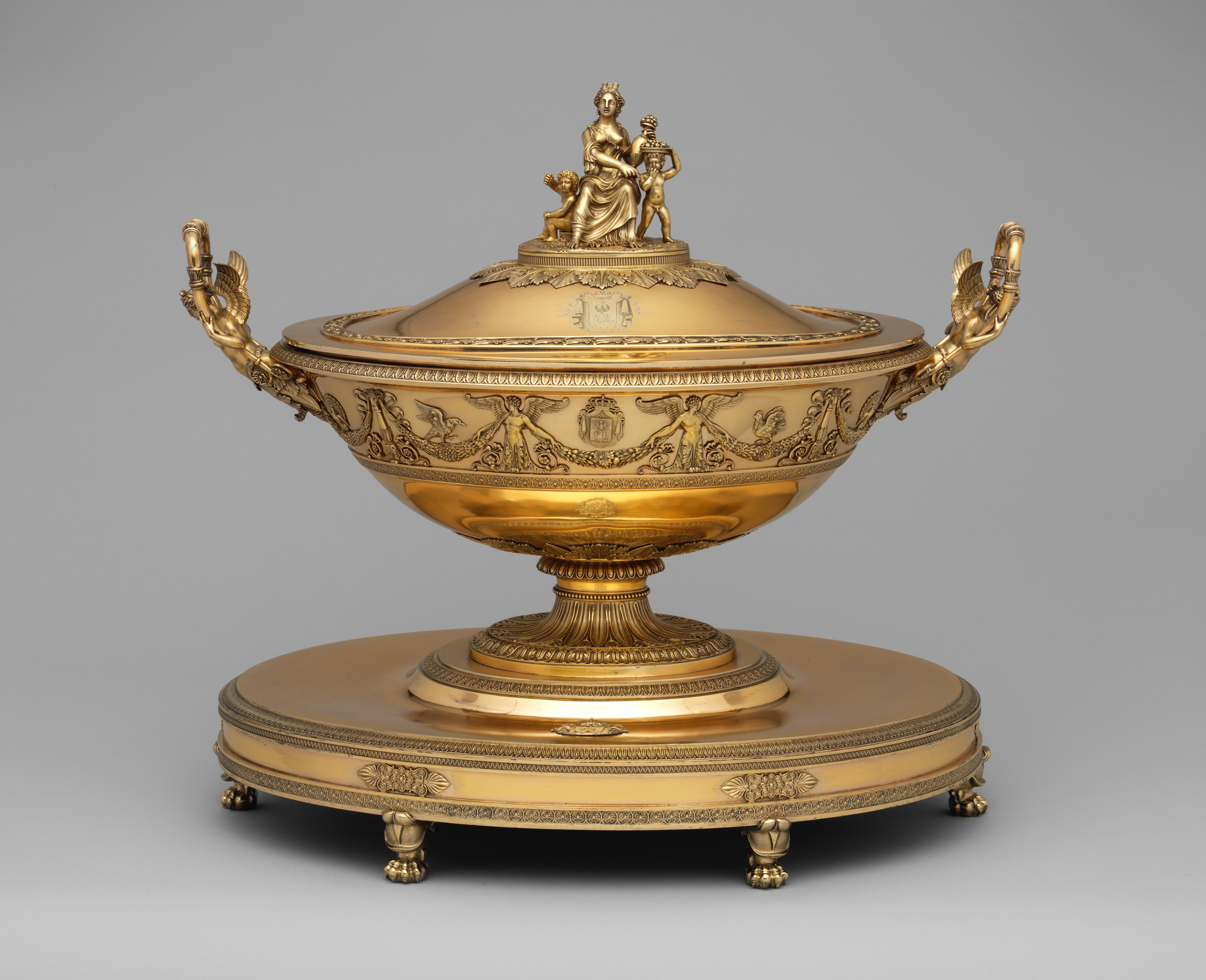
- Artist: Charles Percier, Pierre François Léonard Fontaine
- Year: Napoleonic era, c. 1796-1815
- Medium: Silver gilt
- Dimensions: 46.4 cm × 35.9 cm (18.3 in × 14.1 in)
- Location: Metropolitan Museum of Art; New York City

The Metropolitan Museum of Art possesses in its collection a gilt-silver tureen from the Napoleonic era. Designed by Charles Percier, Pierre François Léonard Fontaine and made by Martin-Guillaume Biennais, the tureen was given to Napoleon I by his sister Pauline and her husband, Prince Camillo Borghese. The tureen was later donated to the Met as part of the bequest of Joseph Pulitzer.
