= Le Bourg-Saint-Léonard =

- Part of Gouffern en Auge
- Location of Le Bourg-Saint-Léonard
- Location within France Location within Normandy
- Coordinates: 48°45′40″N 0°06′22″E
- Country: France
- Region: Normandy
- Department: Orne
- Arrondissement: Argentan
- Canton: Argentan-2
- Commune: Gouffern en Auge
- Area^{1}: 9.25 km^{2} (3.57 sq mi)
- Elevation: 286 m (938 ft)
- Highest elevation: 226 m (741 ft)
- Lowest elevation: 113 m (371 ft)
- Population (2023): 390
  - Density: 42/km^{2} (110/sq mi)
- Time zone: UTC+01:00 (CET)
  - Summer (DST): UTC+02:00 (CEST)
- Postal code: 61310
- ^{1} French Land Register data, which excludes lakes, ponds, glaciers > 1 km^{2} (0.386 sq mi or 247 acres) and river estuaries.

Le Bourg-Saint-Léonard (French pronunciation: [lə buʁ sɛ̃ leɔnaʁ]) is a former commune in the Orne department in northwestern France. On 1 January 2017, it was merged into the new commune Gouffern en Auge.

== See also ==
- Communes of the Orne department
