= Martin-Guillaume Biennais =

French goldsmith and silversmith

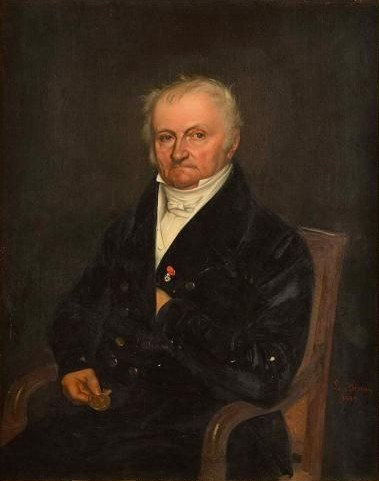
- Portrait of Martin-Guillaume Biennais, 1835, by Léon Fleury
- Born: April 29, 1764; La Cochère
- Died: March 27, 1843 (aged 78); Paris
- Citizenship: French
- Occupations: Goldsmith and Silversmith

Martin-Guillaume Biennais (French pronunciation: [maʁtɛ̃ ɡijom bjɛnɛ]; La Cochère, April 29, 1764 – Paris, March 27, 1843) was a French goldsmith and silversmith.

== Biography ==
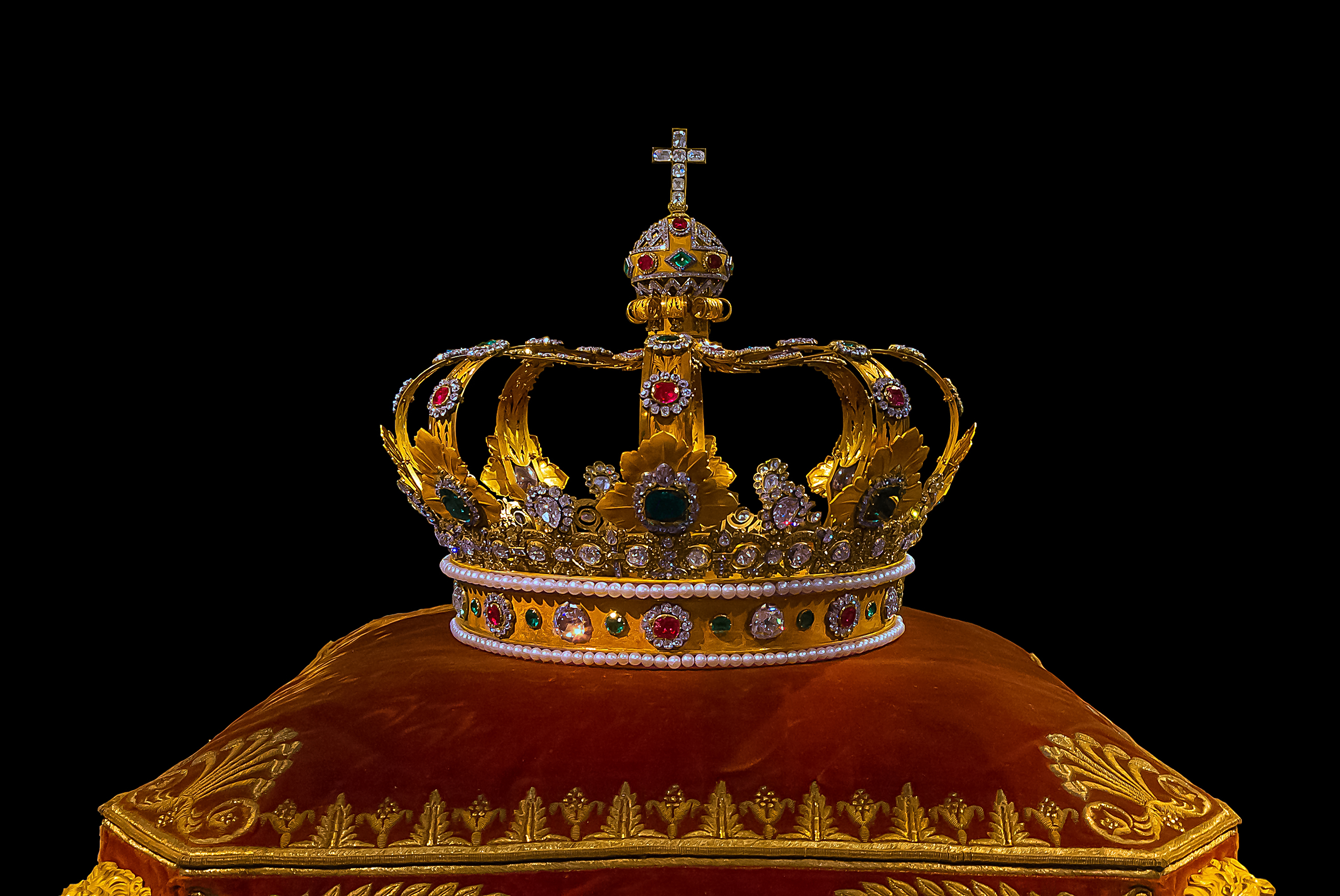
Crown of the King of Bavaria

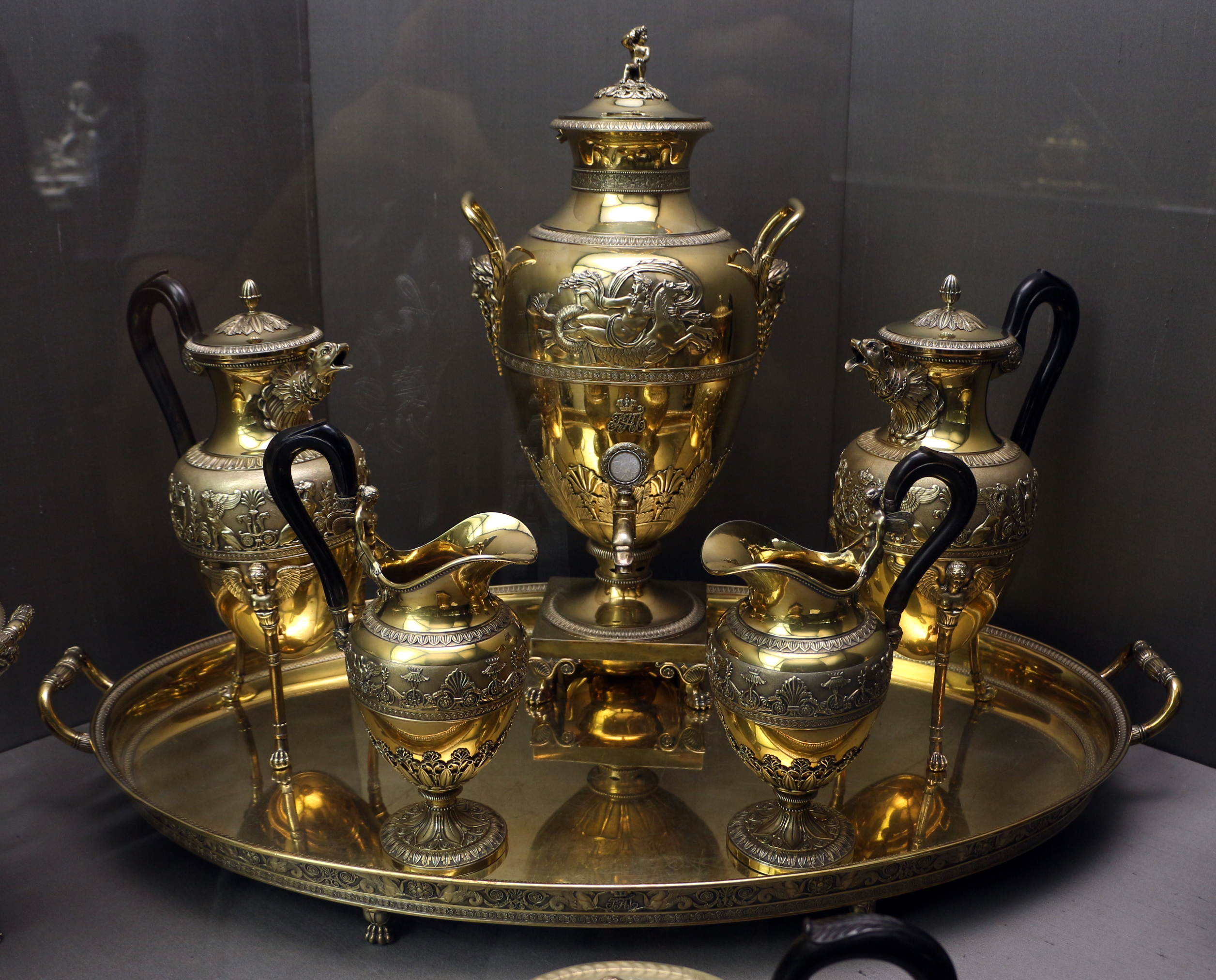
Samovar, pair of coffee and milk jugs with tray (1815)

Martin-Guillaume Biennais was born in La Cochère on April 29, 1764.

After his father's death, Biennais moved to Paris in 1788, where he initially engaged in commerce; he married but was widowed after a year.

The first part of his career he dedicated mainly to goldsmithing, but after the end of the revolutionary period, he approached more to silverware, since gold and silver objects during the Napoleonic Empire could be worked and produced.

In addition to all kinds of silverware, jewelry, porcelain, religious objects, various white weapons embellished with military decorations, he produced mahogany furniture, such as chests of drawers, consoles, coffee tables, toilets and beds.

He was one of the best silversmiths in the translation of the classical style spread for Napoleon Bonaparte by his "ornatisti". While Robert Joseph Auguste gave the best of his art in the period of Louis XVI, Biennais and Jean-Baptiste-Claude Odiot proved to be the most capable interpreters of the Napoleonic model.

Of the two, however, Biennais was the most appreciated among his contemporaries, and also the most prolific.

Biennais was responsible for the execution of the insignia of Napoleon's coronation ceremony on December 2, 1804: the sword, the laurel wreath, the great necklace of the legion of honor, the Grand-Septre, the ball of the world and the hand of justice.

The work that made him famous in his time was the silver cradle made for the king of Rome, although Biennais was probably only the executor, because the design was provided by Pierre-François-Léonard Fontaine or by the other great "ornatist" of the Empire, Charles Percier.

All the other works he produced were instead designed by Biennais himself, and sometimes executed by his collaborators, as evidenced by the marks present next to his.

He made most of the silver service for the King of Bavaria crowned in 1806, now housed in the Residenzmuseum in Munich, and his clients included the Grand Duchess of Tuscany, the King of the Netherlands, Jerome of Westphalia, Prince Camillo Borghese.

At the end of his career, in the early years of the Restoration, Biennais worked mainly for a foreign clientele.

In 1819, Biennais suddenly decided to leave the company, passing the hand to one of his main collaborators. He spent his last years in La Verrière, his country residence. Biennais died at his home in Paris on March 27, 1843, at the age of seventy-eight, surrounded by his children.

== See also ==
- History of art

== Bibliography ==
- Germain Bapst (1886). "Lorfèvrerie française au XVIIIe siècle. Quelques œuvres de Th. Germain". Revue des Arts décoratifs (in French). No. 4. p. 200.
- Michèle Bimbenet-Privat (2014). "Les pots à oille Walpole entre Louis XIV et rocaille". Grande Galerie (in French). No. 28. pp. 50–52.
- Charissa Bremer-David (1997). French Tapestries and Textiles in the J. Paul Getty Museum. Los Angeles: The J. Paul Getty Museum.
- R. Came (1962). Silver. Londra.
- Carles Codina (2010). Orfebrería (in Spanish). Barcelona: Parramón.
- Sergio Coradeschi (1994). Plata (in Spanish). Madrid: Anaya.
- Jacques de Drouas (1983). "Un orfèvre au XVIIIe siècle : Nicolas Besnier, échevin de Paris". Bulletin de la Société de l'Histoire de Paris et de l'Ile-de-France (in French). pp. 97–149.
- F. Dennis (1960). Three Centuries of French Domestic Silver. New York.
- Anne Dion-Tenenbaum (2003). L'Orfèvre de Napoléon (in French). Parigi: Réunion des musées nationaux.
- Anne Dion-Tenenbaum (2011). Orfèvrerie française au xixe siècle - La collection du musée du Louvre (in French). Parigi: Somogy et Musée du Louvre.
- Carl Hernmarck (1978). Die Kunst der europäischen Gold- und Silberschmiede von 1450 bis 1830 (in German). Monaco di Baviera: Beck.
- Claudia Horbas; Renate Möller (2000). Silber von der Renaissance bis zur Moderne. (Fakten, Preise, Trends) (in German). Monaco di Baviera: Deutscher Kunstverlag.
- Félix Lazare; Louis Lazare (1855). Dictionnaire administratif et historique des rues et monuments de Paris (in French). Parigi: Bureau de la Revue municipale.

== Sister projects ==
- Wikimedia Commons contiene immagini o altri file su Martin Guillaume Biennais
