= François Antoine Léon Fleury =

French painter

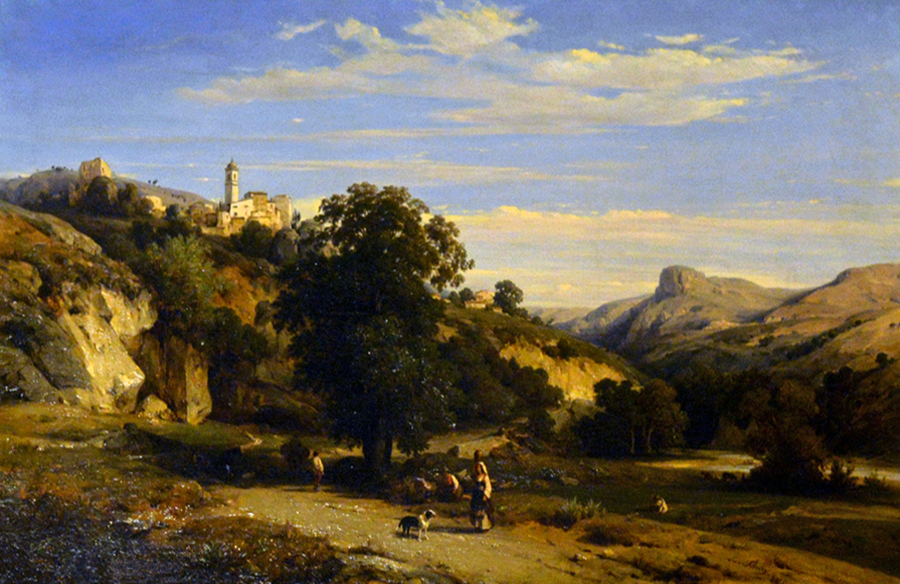
View of the village of Cagnes, near Antibes

François Antoine Léon Fleury (c. 1804 – c. 1858) was a French landscape painter born in Paris. He was the son of Antoine Claude Fleury, under whom he at first studied, and then under Bertin and Hersent. Between 1827 and 1830 he made a sketching tour in France and the neighbouring countries. He occasionally painted figure subjects, such as The Baptism of Christ, at the church of St. Marguerite, and St. Genevieve, at St. Étienne-du-Mont, Paris. He died in 1858. Amongst his works are:

- A View of the Ponte Ratto, Rome. 1831.
- Wood in Normandy. (Bar-le-Duc Museum.)
- View on the Road to Genoa, near Nice. (Amiens Museum.)
- Pasturage in Normandy, near Trouville.
- Water and Mill at Coutivert.
- View on the Coast of Genoa. (Orléans Museum.)
- The Tomb of Caecilia Metella. (National Gallery of Art, Washington)
