= Marie Louis Descorches =

French diplomat

- Born: September 17, 1749; Survie
- Died: 1830 (aged 80–81); Survie
- Citizenship: French
- Occupation: Diplomat

Marie Louis Henri Descorches (17 September 1749 – 1830) was a French diplomat.

Born into French nobility (marquis d`Escorches de Sainte Croix) he enlisted in the French Army, reaching the rank of a colonel in 1780. He renounced his title, adopted the name Descorches and became a vivid supporter of the French Revolution. He was French representative in Poland (1791–1792) and Ottoman Empire (1793–1795). He was prefect of Drôme from 1800 to 1815.
