= Exmes =

- Part of Gouffern en Auge
- Location of Exmes
- Location within France Location within Normandy
- Coordinates: 48°45′40″N 0°10′50″E
- Country: France
- Region: Normandy
- Department: Orne
- Arrondissement: Argentan
- Canton: Argentan-2
- Commune: Gouffern en Auge
- Area^{1}: 10.43 km^{2} (4.03 sq mi)
- Elevation: 317 m (1,040 ft)
- Highest elevation: 268 m (879 ft)
- Lowest elevation: 145 m (476 ft)
- Population (2022): 268
  - Density: 25.7/km^{2} (66.6/sq mi)
- Demonym: Hiémois
- Time zone: UTC+01:00 (CET)
  - Summer (DST): UTC+02:00 (CEST)
- Postal code: 61310
- ^{1} French Land Register data, which excludes lakes, ponds, glaciers > 1 km^{2} (0.386 sq mi or 247 acres) and river estuaries.

Exmes (French pronunciation: [ɛm]) is a former commune in the Orne department in north-western France. On 1 January 2017, it was merged into the new commune Gouffern en Auge. It was the seat of the county of Hiémois (French: Comté d'Hiémois), granted before his death in 1027 by Richard II, Duke of Normandy, to his younger son, Robert, who eventually succeeded as Duke of Normandy. In 1136, Gilbert de Clare, Earl of Pembroke, led an expedition against Exmes and burned parts of the town, including the church of Notre Dame.

Herbert de Losinga, Bishop of Norwich (c. 1095–1119), was born in Exmes as well was François Le Prévost d'Exmes (1729–1793), an 18th-century playwright.

== Toponymy ==
Attested apparently first from Merovingian times, the name is of Celtic origin, with many parallels in other placenames and words.

== Heraldry ==
Arms of Exmes	The arms of Exmes are blazoned : Azure, 2 greyhounds passant argent.

== See also ==
- Communes of the Orne department
