= Silly-en-Gouffern =

- Part of Gouffern en Auge
- Location of Silly-en-Gouffern
- Location within France Location within Normandy
- Coordinates: 48°45′20″N 0°04′13″E
- Country: France
- Region: Normandy
- Department: Orne
- Arrondissement: Argentan
- Canton: Argentan-2
- Commune: Gouffern en Auge
- Area^{1}: 39.83 km^{2} (15.38 sq mi)
- Elevation: 190 m (620 ft)
- Highest elevation: 246 m (807 ft)
- Lowest elevation: 159 m (522 ft)
- Population (2022): 391
  - Density: 9.82/km^{2} (25.4/sq mi)
- Time zone: UTC+01:00 (CET)
  - Summer (DST): UTC+02:00 (CEST)
- Postal code: 61310
- ^{1} French Land Register data, which excludes lakes, ponds, glaciers > 1 km^{2} (0.386 sq mi or 247 acres) and river estuaries.

Silly-en-Gouffern (French pronunciation: [siji ɑ̃ ɡufɛʁn]) is a former commune in the Orne department in north-western France. On 1 January 2017, it was merged into the new commune Gouffern en Auge.

== See also ==
- Communes of the Orne department
