= Antoine-Claude Fleury =

French painter

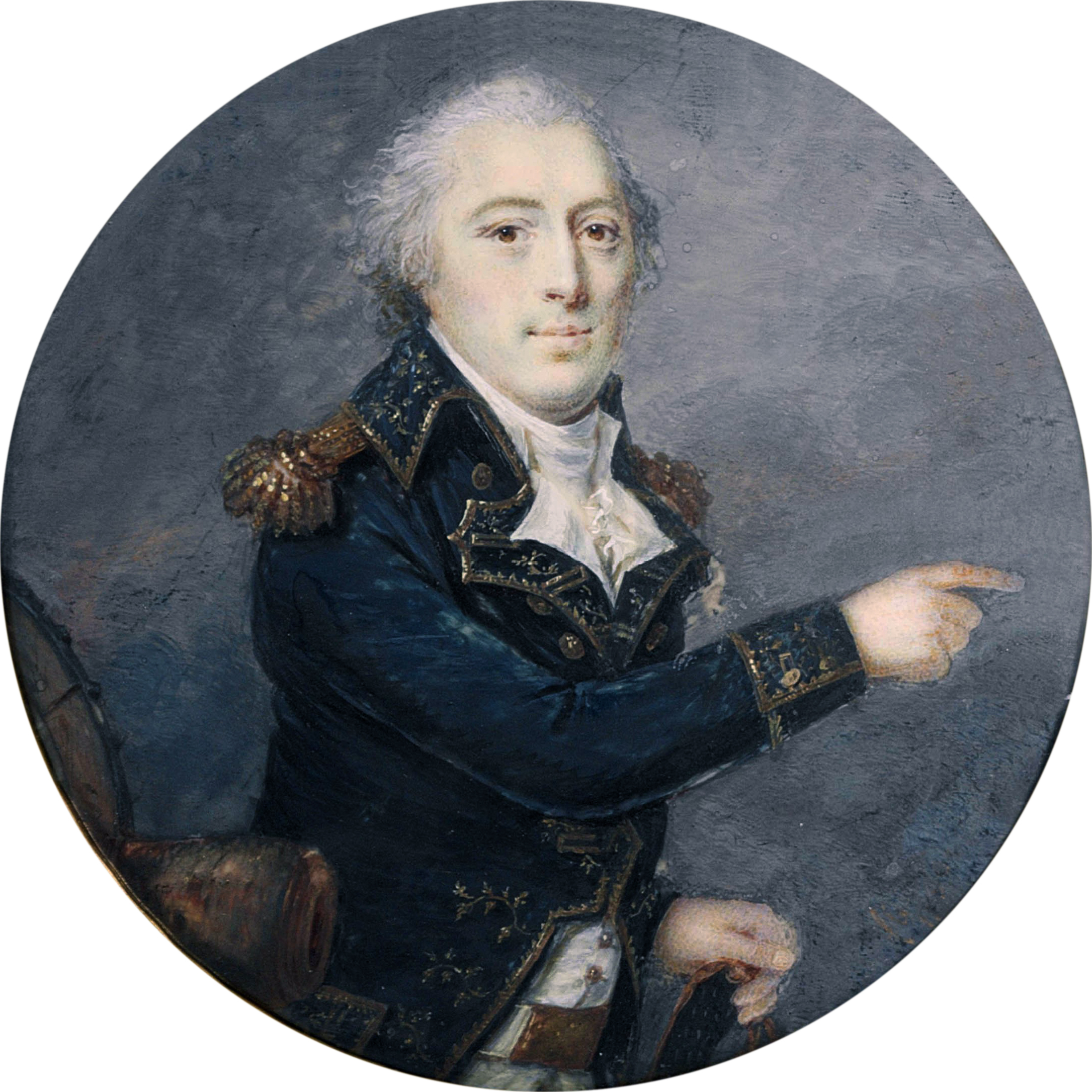
Miniature portrait of General Baron Pierre Thouvenot

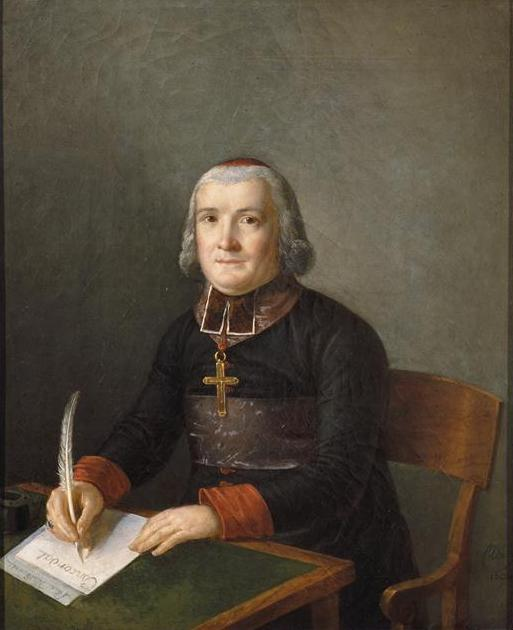
Portrait of cardinal Joseph Fesch, 1807

Antoine-Claude Fleury (1743–1822), a French historical and portrait painter, studied under Regnault, and exhibited at the Salon from 1795 to 1822. Amongst his works are:

- The Abduction of Helen from the Temple of Diana. 1800.
- Theseus going to fight the Minotaur. 1804.
- The Doom of Orestes. 1806.
- Venus and Adonis.
- The Origin of Painting. 1808.
- Cornelia and her Sons. 1810.
- Miss Salisbury. 1812.
- The Flight into Egypt. 1819.
- The Widow's Mite. 1819.
- Portrait of Louis XVIII. 1819.
