= François Le Prévost d'Exmes =

French writer, playwright and literary critic

- Born: 29 November 1729; Exmes, France
- Died: September 1793 (aged 63); Paris, France
- Employer(s): School of Song and Declamation (Grainville)
- Known for: Writing, playwright and literary critic
- Title: Professor of geography and history

François Le Prévost d'Exmes (29 September 1729 in Exmes – September 1793 in Paris) was an 18th-century French writer, playwright and literary critic.

== Works ==
(selection)

- 1747–1749: Histoire générale des voyages; ou Nouvelle collection de toutes les relations de voyages par mer et par terre, qui ont été publiées jusqu’à présent dans les différentes langues de toutes les nations connues, enrichie de cartes géographiques de plans, &c., La Haye, P. DeHondt.
- 1752: les Thessaliennes, three-act comedy at the Comédie Italienne
- 1756: La Revue des feuilles de Mr. Fréron : lettres à Madame de, London
- 1758: la Nouvelle Réconciliation, comedy in one act
- 1759: Les Trois Rivaux : opéra comique, Amsterdam, Paris, Cuissart.
- 1761: Réflexions sur le système des nouveaux philosophes, Francfort.
- 1770: Le Nouveau Spectateur : ou examen des nouvelles pièces de théâtre, dans lequel on a ajouté les ariettes notées, Geneva, Valade
- 1779: Lully, musicien, Paris.
- 1782: Étrennes du Parnasse. Choix de Poésies, Paris, Couturier.
- 1784: Vies des écrivains étrangers, tant anciens que modernes; accompagnées de divers morceaux de leurs ouvrages, Paris, Veuve Duchesne.

== Sources ==
- François-Xavier de Feller, Supplément au dictionnaire historique, Lyon, Méquignon, 1819
- Édouard Frère, Manuel du bibliographe normand, Rouen, Le Brument, 1860
- Jean Chrétien Ferdinand Hoefer, Nouvelle biographie générale, Paris, Firmin-Didot, 1872, vol.XLI, (p. 11–12)
