= La Cochère =

- Part of Gouffern en Auge
- Location of La Cochère
- Location within France Location within Normandy
- Coordinates: 48°43′30″N 0°09′08″E
- Country: France
- Region: Normandy
- Department: Orne
- Arrondissement: Argentan
- Canton: Argentan-2
- Commune: Gouffern en Auge
- Area^{1}: 12.92 km^{2} (4.99 sq mi)
- Elevation: 183 m (600 ft)
- Highest elevation: 252 m (827 ft)
- Lowest elevation: 173 m (568 ft)
- Population (2022): 147
  - Density: 11.4/km^{2} (29.5/sq mi)
- Time zone: UTC+01:00 (CET)
  - Summer (DST): UTC+02:00 (CEST)
- Postal code: 61310
- ^{1} French Land Register data, which excludes lakes, ponds, glaciers > 1 km^{2} (0.386 sq mi or 247 acres) and river estuaries.

La Cochère (French pronunciation: [la kɔʃɛʁ]) is a former commune in the Orne department in north-western France. On 1 January 2017, it was merged into the new commune Gouffern en Auge.

== See also ==
- Communes of the Orne department
