= Étienne-Éloi Labarre =

French architect

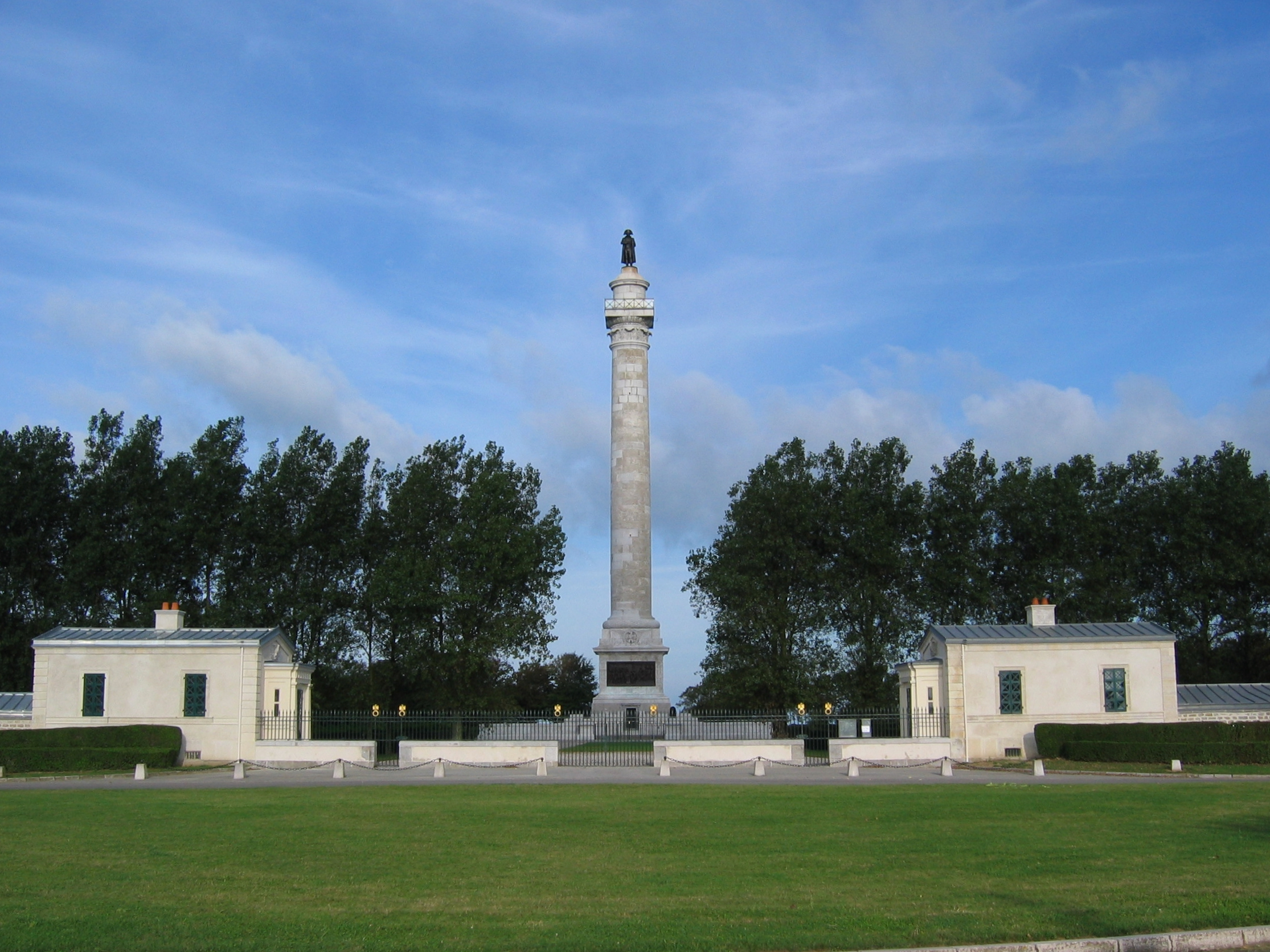
Colonne de la Grande Armée

Étienne-Éloi Labarre (1764–1833) was a French architect.

He produced the plans for the Colonne de la grande Armée at Wimille, erected in 1804 on the order of Napoléon I. From 1825 to 1827, he built Boulogne-sur-Mer's second-ever theatre, which was destroyed in a fire in 1854.

He was charged with completing the Palais Brongniart between 1813 and 1826, after the death of Alexandre Théodore Brongniart.
