= Jean Guillaume Moitte =

French sculptor (1746–1810)

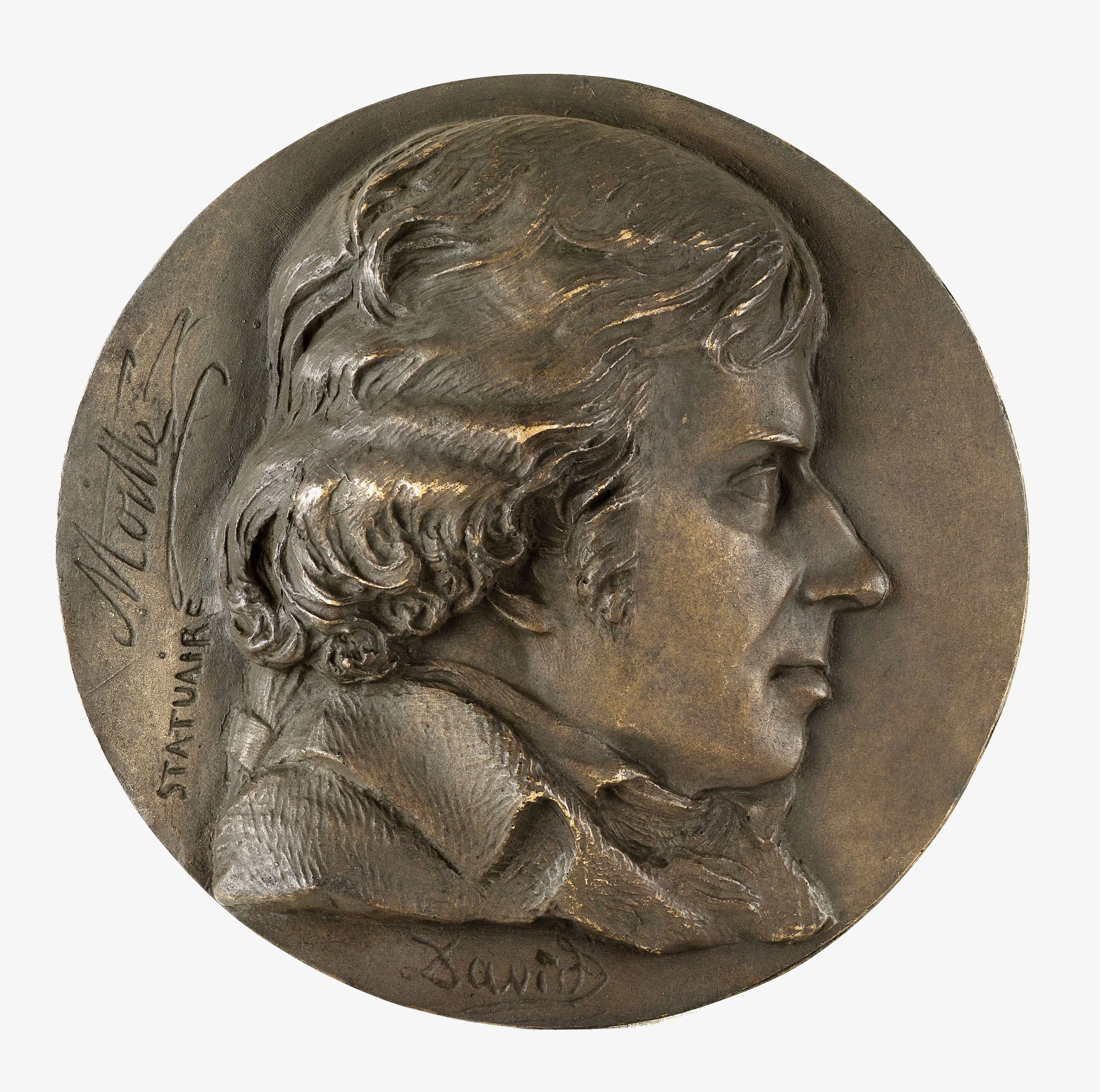
Portrait of Moitte by David d'Angers

Jean-Guillaume Moitte (11 November 1746, Paris – 2 May 1810, Paris) was a French sculptor.

== Life ==
Jean-Guillaume Moitte was the son of Pierre-Etienne Moitte. He became the sculptor of Pigalle then Jean-Baptiste Lemoyne. He won the Prix de Rome for sculpture in 1768 with David carrying the head of Goliath in triumph. He then entered the École royale des élèves protégés before a stay at the Rome, though it was cut short due to illness.

In the 1770s, Moitte drafted numerous designs for the royal goldsmiths of the king, Robert-Joseph Auguste and then his son Henri Auguste, and participated in decorative works for monuments in the French capital. He was commissioned to produce sculptures of generals who had died in battle such as one of Custine for the musée de Versailles, the tomb of Louis Desaix at Grand Saint-Bernard or that of Leclerc at the Panthéon de Paris. He also designed and sculpted the pediment for the Panthéon during the French Revolution, with the theme of the Fatherland crowning the civil and heroic virtues Moitte and Philippe-Laurent Roland were the main sculptors for the exterior of the hôtel de Salm.

Moitte was a member of the Institut de France, the Légion d'honneur and professor of the École des Beaux-Arts de Paris.

== Works ==
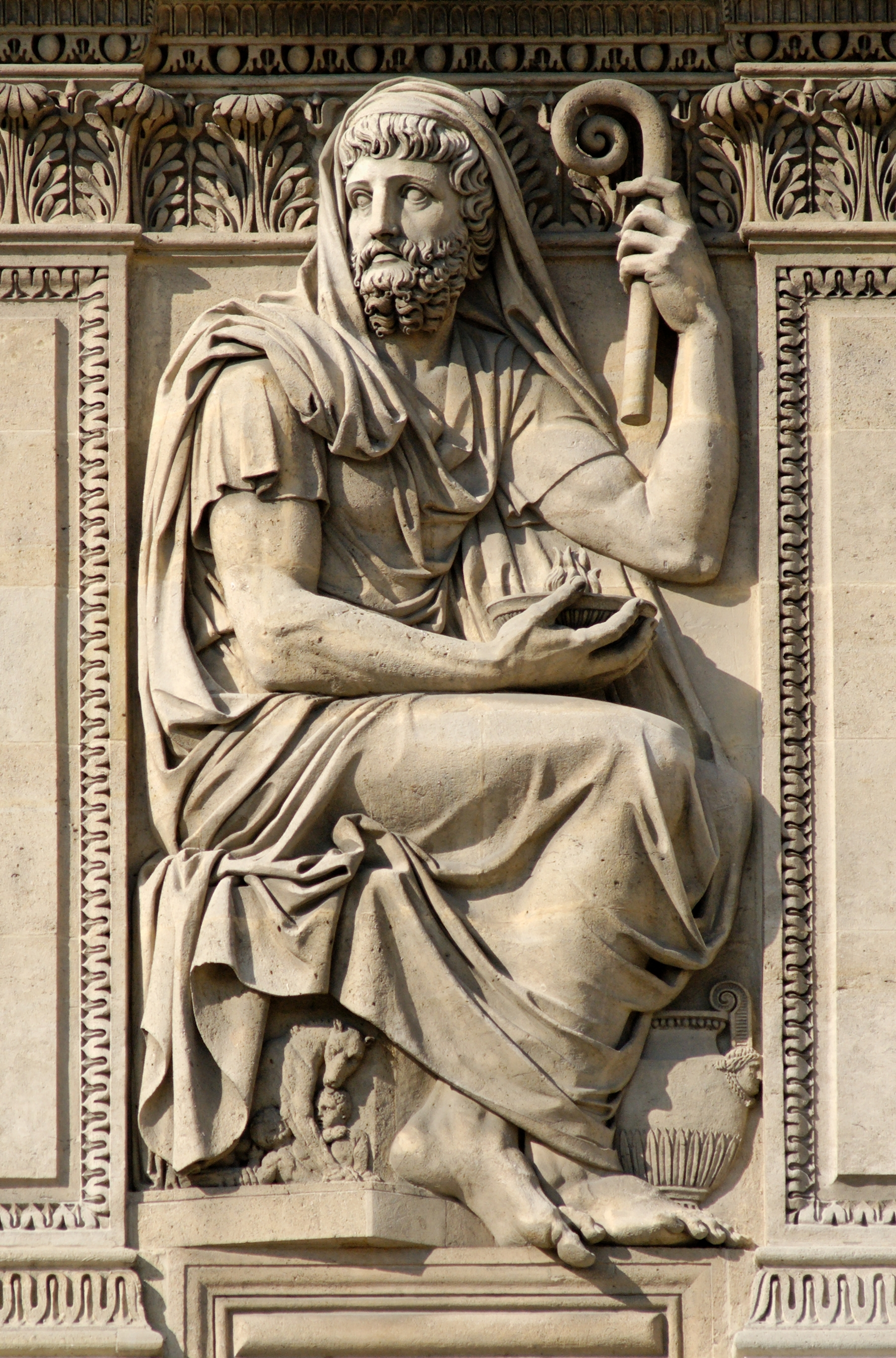
Herodotus, relief on the west façade of the cour Carrée, palais du Louvre, 1806

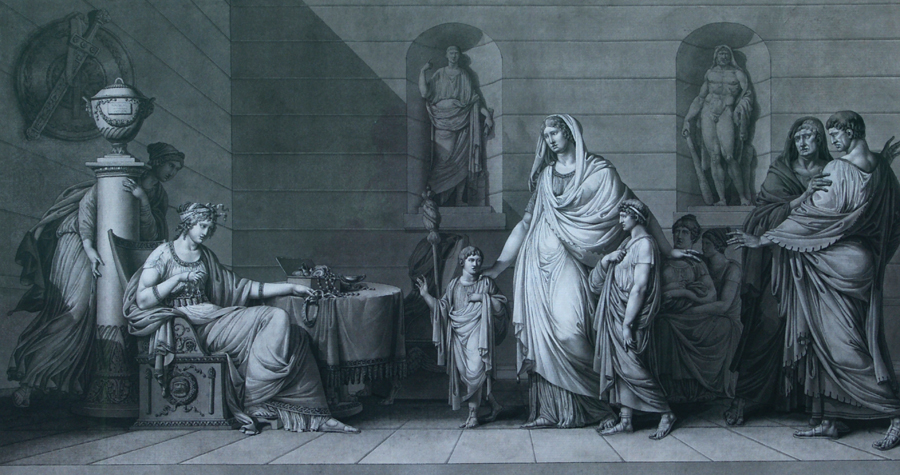
Cornelia, mother of the Gracchi (1795), Mougins Museum of Classical Art

=== Louvre ===
- Law, Numa, Manco Cápac, Moses and a pharaoh , bas-reliefs, bronze, Paris, musée du Louvre
- Minerva, statuette, terracotta, Paris, musée du Louvre
- The Triumph of Voltaire (1778), drawing, Paris, musée du Louvre, département des arts graphiques
- Orpheus in the underworld, drawing, Paris, musée du Louvre, département des arts graphiques
- Orpheus and Eurydice, drawing, Paris, musée du Louvre, département des arts graphiques
- Thucydides, Herodotus, Egyptian divinity and an Inca (1806), stone reliefs, Paris, palais du Louvre, cour Carrée, attic of the west façade, to the right of the Pavillon de l’Horloge

=== Hôtel de Salm, Palais de la Légion d’honneur ===
- Two Renommée, bas-reliefs, stone, main gate
- Festival of the Pales, bas-relief, stone, at the base of the courtyard
- Five bas-reliefs and six allegorical statues, stone, corps central quai Anatole-France
- Ceres, Mars and Diana, terracotta studies for statues on the coupole

=== Other ===
- Rousseau observing childhood's first steps, group, terracotta (1790), Paris, musée Carnavalet
- Dansers, frieze of the attic of the barrière d’Enfer, stone, Paris, place Denfert-Rochereau
- Portrait of Leonardo da Vinci, white marble bust, Fontainebleau, château
- The Rhine and The Nile, deux bas-reliefs for the tomb du général Desaix dans l’hospice du Grand-Saint-Bernard ainsi que ses deux plâtres modèles, bas-reliefs, Versailles, châteaux de Versailles et de Trianon
- Adam Philippe, comte de Custine, commander in chief (1742–1793) (Salon of 1810), larger-than-life-size marble statue, Versailles, châteaux de Versailles et de Trianon, completed by Jean-Baptiste Stouf
- Giovanni Domenico Cassini (1625–1712), terracotta equestrian statuette, Bayonne, musée Bonnat
- A sacrifice, drawing, Dijon, musée Magnin
- Departure (1798–1799), drawing, Vizille, Musée de la Révolution française
- Original bas-reliefs (destroyed) and two bronze lions (surviving), Column of the Grande Armée, Wimille
- Cornelia, mother of the Gracchi (1795), Mougins Museum of Classical Art

== Sources ==
- Simone Hoog, (preface by Jean-Pierre Babelon, in collaboration with Roland Brossard), Musée national de Versailles. Les sculptures. I- Le musée, Réunion des musées nationaux, Paris, 1993.
- Pierre Kjellberg, Le Nouveau guide des statues de Paris, La Bibliothèque des Arts, Paris, 1988.
- Catalogue d’exposition, Skulptur aus dem Louvre. Sculptures françaises néo-classiques. 1760 - 1830, Paris, musée du Louvre, 23 mai - 3 septembre 1990.
