= Odiot =

Odiot is a surname. Notable people with the surname include:

- Charles Nicolas Odiot (died 1869), French silversmith
- Jean-Baptiste-Claude Odiot (1763–1850), French silversmith
