= François Joseph Bosio =

French sculptor

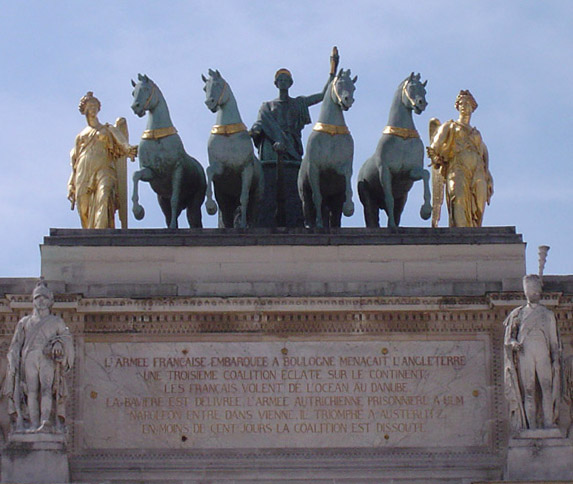
Quadriga on the Arc de Triomphe du Carrousel, Paris, commemorating the Restoration of the Bourbons.

Baron François Joseph Bosio (19 March 1768 – 29 July 1845) was a Monegasque sculptor who achieved distinction in the first quarter of the nineteenth century with his work for Napoleon and for the restored French monarchy.

== Biography ==
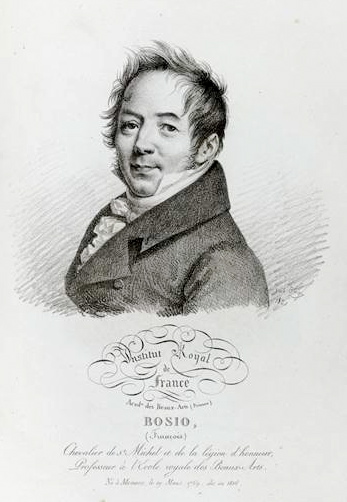
Portrait of Bosio by Julien-Léopold Boilly

Born in Monaco, Bosio was given a scholarship by prince Honoré I to study in Paris with the eminent sculptor Augustin Pajou. After brief service in the Revolutionary army he lived in Florence, Rome and Naples, providing sculpture for churches under the French hegemony in Italy in the 1790s. He was recruited by Dominique Vivant Denon in 1808 to make bas-reliefs for the monumental column in the Place Vendôme in Paris and also to serve as portrait sculptor to Emperor Napoleon and his family. It was in this capacity that he produced some of his finest work, notably marble portrait busts of the Empress Josephine, which was also modelled in biscuit Sèvres porcelain, and of Queen Hortense (about 1810), which was also cast in bronze by Ravrio.

Louis XVIII made Bosio a Knight of the Order of Saint Michael in 1821 and appointed him premier sculpteur du Roi. In 1828, Bosio saw his grandiose equestrian sculpture of Louis XIV erected in the Place des Victoires in Paris and was made an Officier of the Légion d'honneur. He was made a baron by Charles X in 1825. Though under Louis-Philippe he was stripped of his titles, he continued to receive official commissions, as the ablest portrait sculptor in Paris, and created the statue of Napoleon for the Column of the Grande Armée in 1840 under Napoleon III. He died in Paris.

Apart from the imperial busts and the statue of Louis XVI, other important works included the quadriga of the Arc de Triomphe du Carrousel and the statue of Hercules fighting Acheloos transformed into a snake (illustration) in the Louvre. Many of his most important sculptures and statues can today be found in the Louvre museum in Paris.

A study of Bosio was published by L. Barbarin, Etude sur Bosio, sa vie et son oeuvre (Monaco) 1910.

== Summary of key works ==
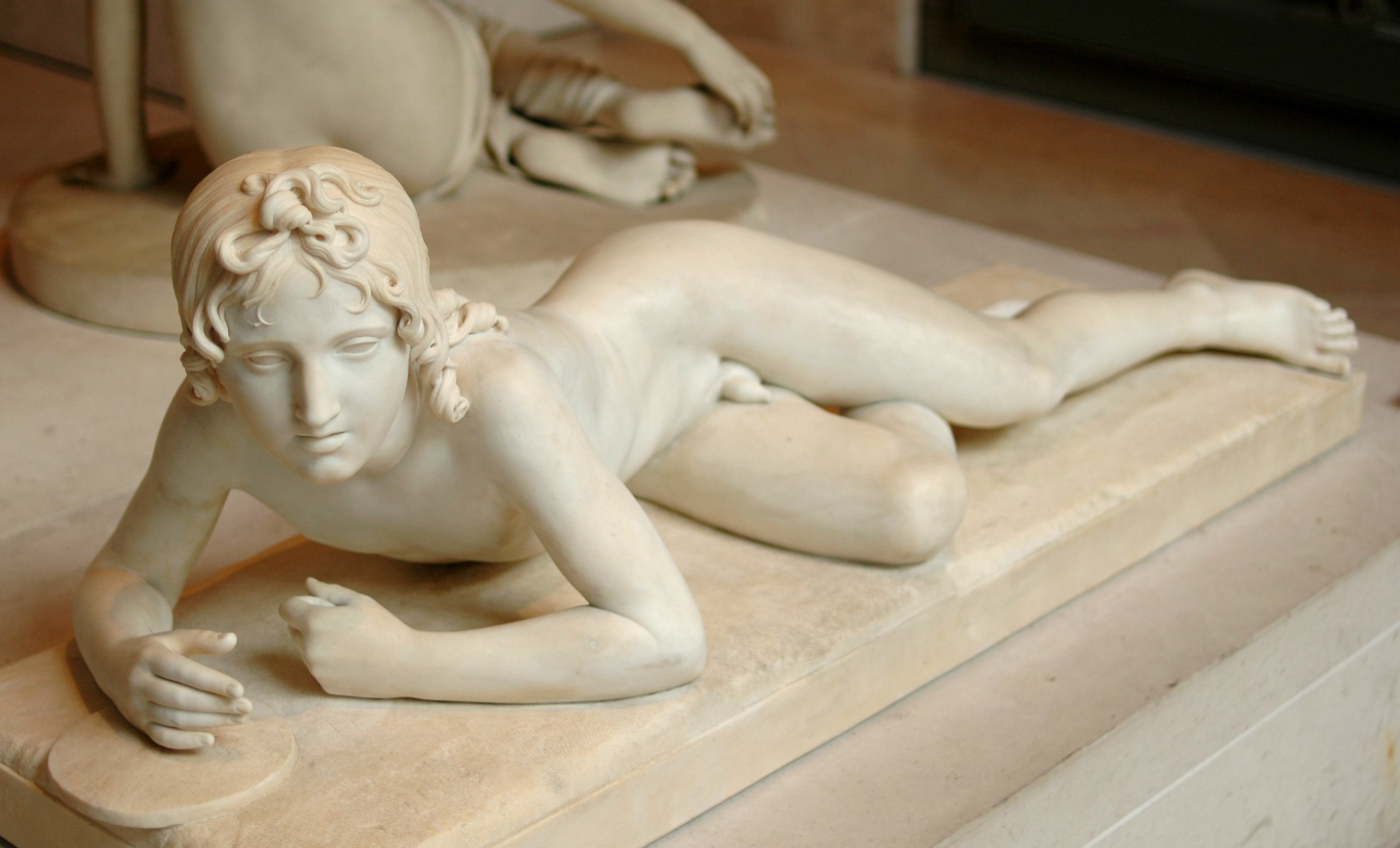
Hyacinth (1817)

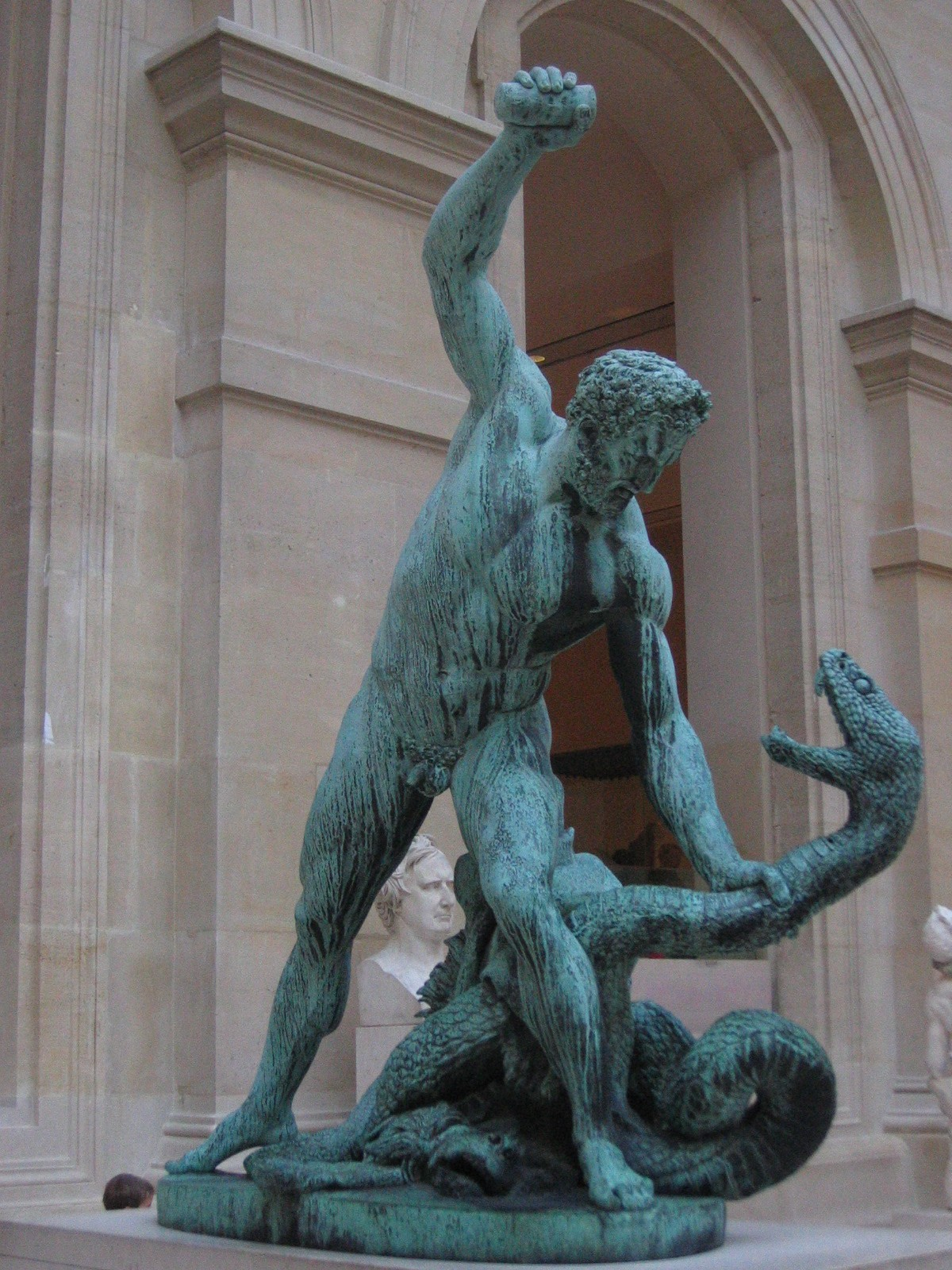
Hercules fighting Acheloos transformed into a snake (1824)

=== In Paris ===
- Quadriga of the Arc de Triomphe du Carrousel (on the Place du Carrousel)
- Hercules Wrestling Achelous, Louvre.
- Equestrian sculpture of Louis XIV (1816–1828) (in Place des Victoires)
- Monument to Louis XVI (begun 1816, installed 1835) in the Chapelle Expiatoire.
- In the Louvre:
  - Aristaeus, god of gardens (1813–1817), An official commission for the Imperial palaces through Vivant-Denon, 7 December 1812; marble delivered to Bosio January 1813.
  - Jérôme Bonaparte, King of Westphalia. This bust was replicated at least fifty-four times
  - Hyacinth (1817)
  - Henry IV as a child (1824–25) This was commissioned for his study at the Tuileries by Louis XVIII; it was cast in silver by the silversmith Charles-Nicolas Odiot
  - Hercules and the Lernaean Hydra (1824)
  - Bust of Charles X (1825–29)
  - Bust of the Duchess of Angoulême (1825)
  - The nymph Salmacis (1826). A reduced replica is used as the top award at the Festival de Télévision de Monte-Carlo
  - Bust of Queen Marie-Amélie (1841) Shown at the salon of 1837; the first marble version is at the Louvre; a repetition is at the Metropolitan Museum of Art
  - Queen Marie-Amélie (1841–43), standing figure. Bosio's original plaster, pointed for a marble version, is at the Louvre Museum at Saint-Omer. The marble, finished after Bosio's death by his nephew, is at Versailles.

=== Elsewhere ===
- Cupid with a bow (1808) (Hermitage Museum, Russia)
- Bust of Queen Marie-Amélie of France (1841) (Metropolitan Museum of Art, New York)
- Bust of the marquis d'Aligre (bronze) owner of the Château de Baronville(California Palace of the Legion of Honor)
- Portrait Bust of the Empress Marie-Louise, c. 1810–1815 Dallas Museum of Art
- Portrait Bust of Catherine, Princess of Wurtemburg, c. 1810–1815 Dallas Museum of Art
- Bronze bust of King Louis XVIII
