= Henri Auguste =

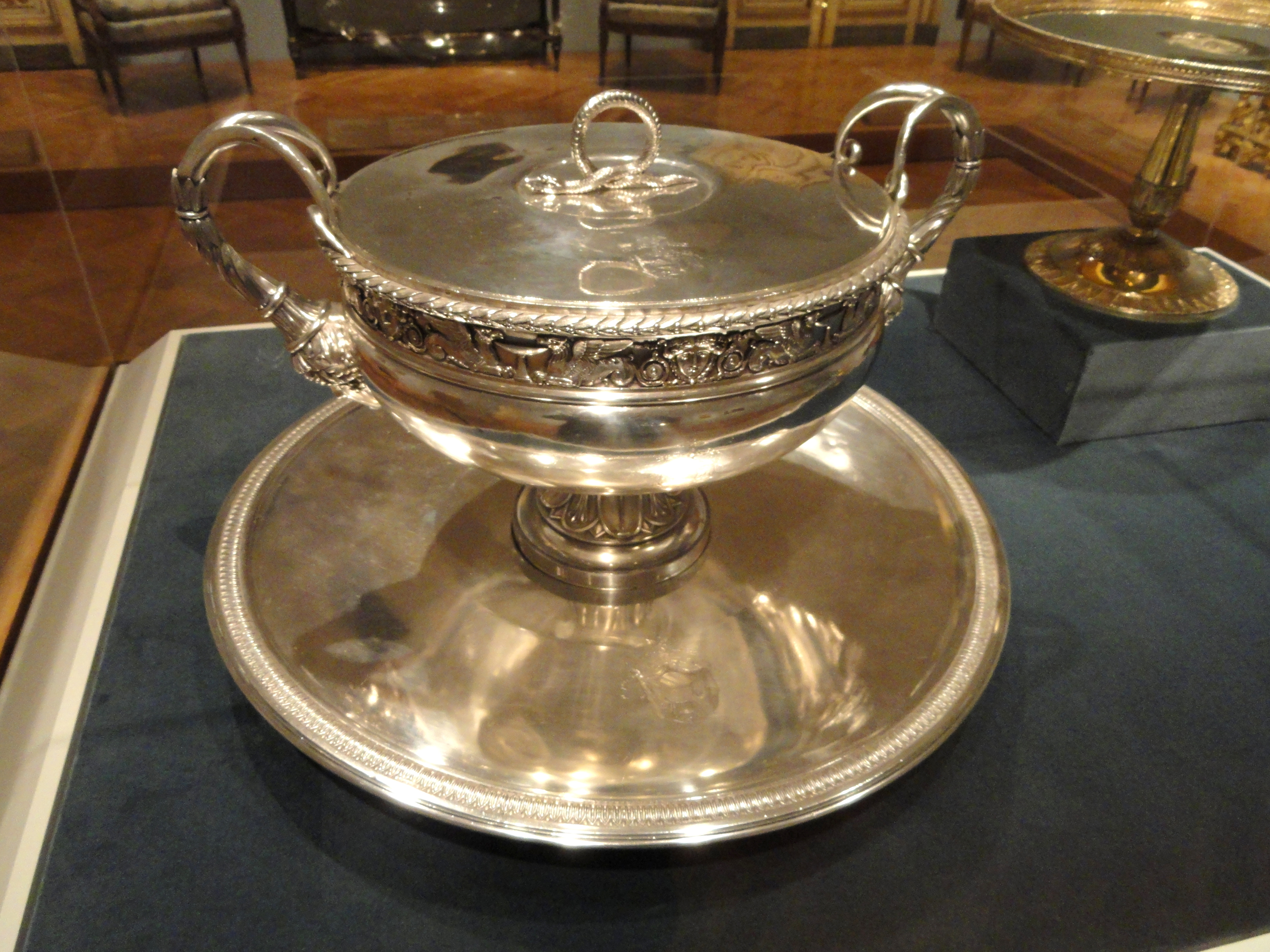
Covered Tureen with Tray, 1798–1809, by Henri Auguste

Henri Auguste (1759–1816) was a leading Parisian gold- and silversmith, working in the neoclassical style. In cooperation with the sculptor Jean Guillaume Moitte, who provided him with designs and models, he became one of the leading designers of Empire style in orfèvrerie, a rival of Jean-Baptiste-Claude Odiot and Martin-Guillaume Biennais.

He was the only son of the royal goldsmith Robert-Joseph Auguste (1723–1805), whose workshop he assumed in 1784–85. He continued to receive official patronage under Louis XVI from 1784 onwards and also from Napoleon, as well as from the City of Paris, which commissioned a vast silver service in 1804, in connection with the coronation of Napoleon; of the service that comprised 425 pieces, most were melted down under Charles X; of the remainder, 24 pieces are exhibited in the Salle à manger, Château de Malmaison. Among his private patrons was William Beckford, who was introduced to the work of Moitte and Auguste in Portugal, where he viewed the toilette of Madame d'Aranda in 1787, "by far the most exquisite chef d'oeuvre of the kind I ever saw"; between 1788 and 1802 Beckford acquired four ewers from Auguste, one of them gold, the others silver-gilt; two of them were accompanied by basins.

Auguste received a gold medal in the 3rd Exposition d'industrie, Paris, 1802. He was declared bankrupt in 1806, however, and, though he was given a period of time in which to order his affairs, was caught at Dieppe in 1809 with 94 packing cases (containing some silver, scientific instruments, and furniture) attempting to flee to England and was adjudged a fraudulent bankrupt. He fled successfully to England in 1809. In 1810 his rival Odiot acquired a number of drawings from his workshop, including one for a wine cooler from the City of Paris banquet service, attributed to Moitte and bearing Odiot's collection mark, now at the J. Paul Getty Museum. He died in Jamaica in 1816.

A silver-gilt tureen and stand, made by Auguste for Tommaso Somma, marchese di Circello, 1787, was purchased for the Royal Collection in 1801.

A family portrait, Famille de l'orfèvre Henri Auguste réunie autour d'un table, painted by Gérard François Pascal Simon, 1798, shows the fashionably-dressed couple and their two young sons, grouped around a table in the light of a shaded lamp.
