= Jean-Baptiste Stouf =

French sculptor (1742–1826)

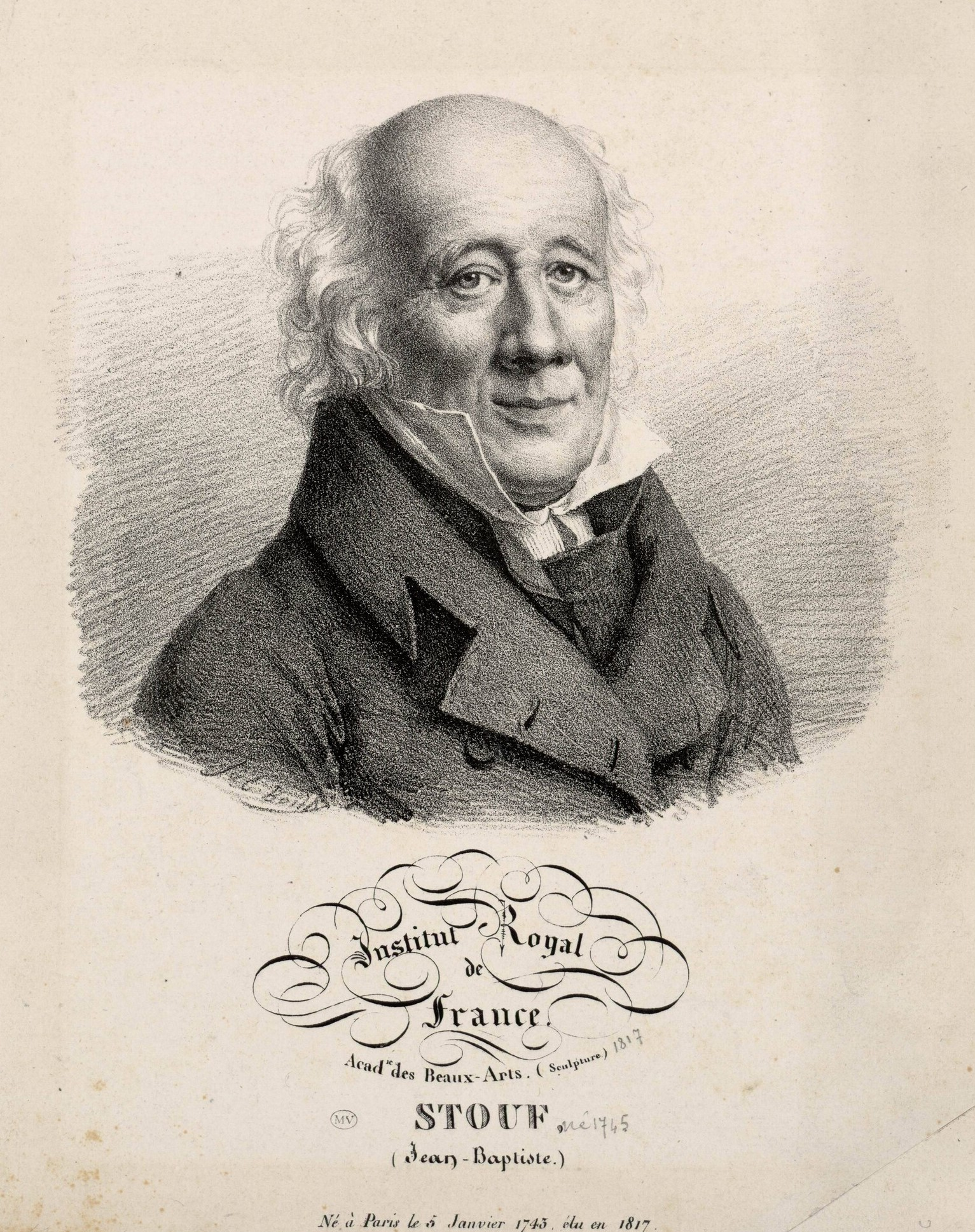
Portrait by Jules Boilly, 1820–1823

Affliction, 1789, Louvre Museum

Jean-Baptiste Stouf (Paris, 1742 – Charenton-le-Pont, 1 July 1826) was a French sculptor known especially for his commemorative portrait busts and expressive emotional content.

== Biography ==
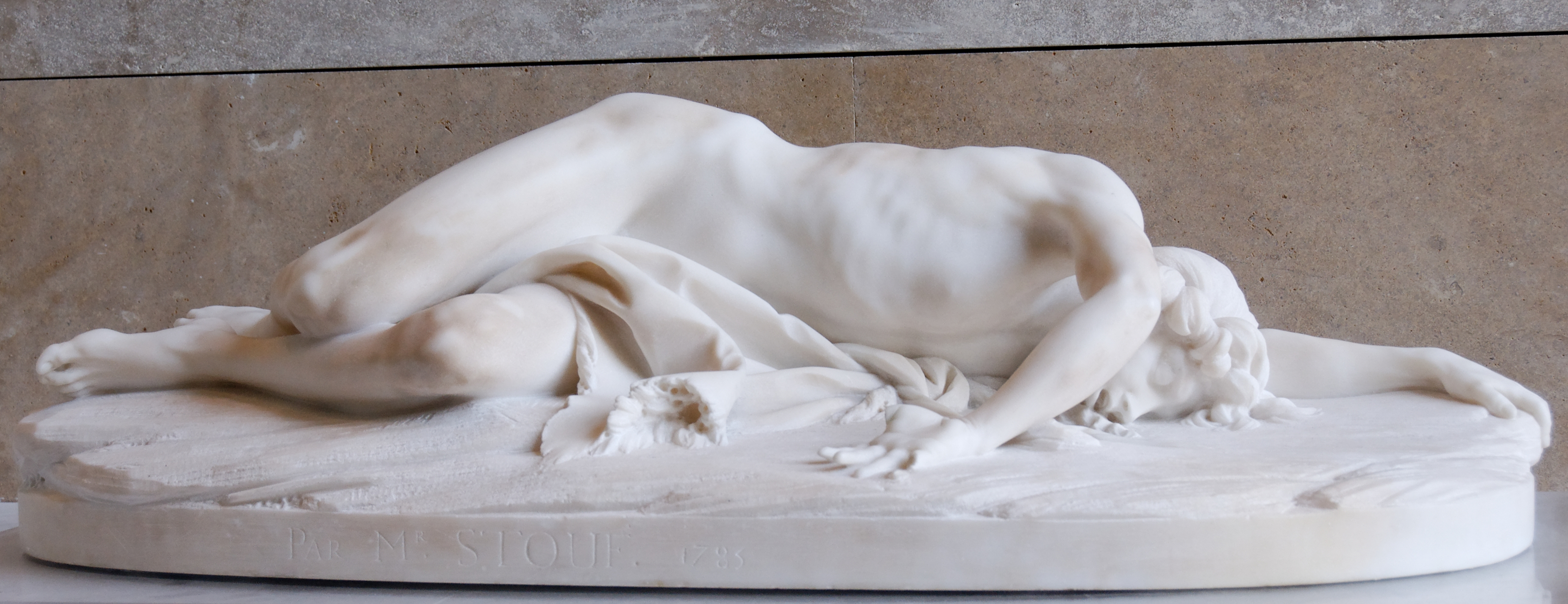
Abel dying, reception piece for the Royal Academy of Painting and Sculpture, 1785, Louvre Museum

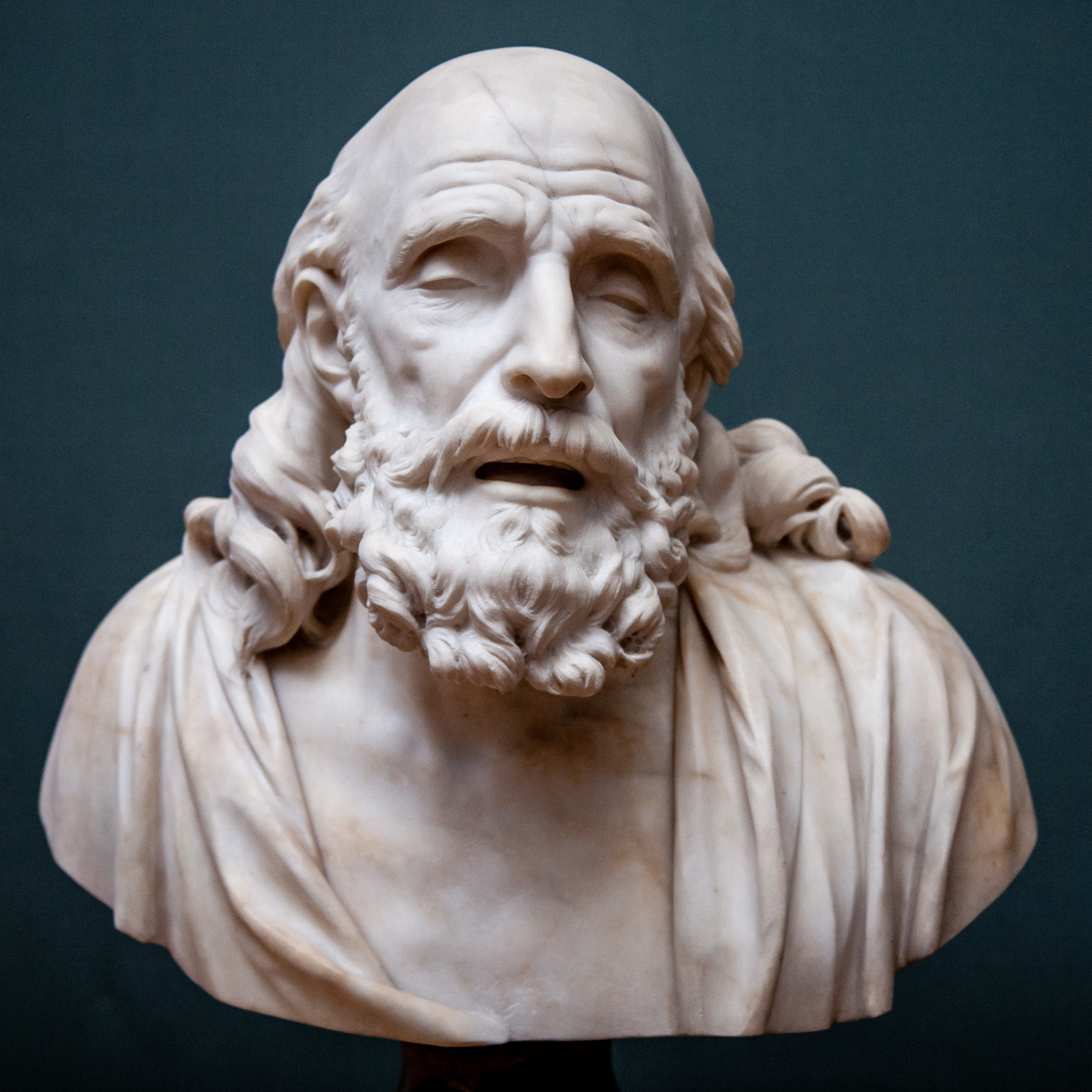
Bust of Belisarius, 1785–91, Marble, J. Paul Getty Villa

Stouf was a pupil of Guillaume Coustou the Younger, son of the great French baroque sculptor Guillaume Coustou. He went to the Academy of France in Rome in 1770, although the previous year he had only obtained second place at the Prix-de-Rome. After a stay of eight years, he was approved at the Royal Academy of Painting and Sculpture in 1784, and became an academician the following year. In 1786 the Comte d'Angiviller awarded him the commission for a Saint Vincent de Paul, to complete the series of statues of illustrious men at the Louvre Palace. On 8 September 1810, he succeeded Jean-Guillaume Moitte as professor of sculpture at the École des Beaux-Arts in Paris. He participated in the Salon until 1819.

Stouf's Bust of Belisarius at the J. Paul Getty Museum shows the general of Justinian, blinded, as a beggar, in a manner that suggests a philosopher or saint. His reception piece for the Royal Academy of Painting and Sculpture in 1785, the Death of Abel, shows Cain's victim sprawled full-length on the ground (Louvre Museum). The Detroit Museum of Art has a terracotta sketch for a Hercules Vanquishing Two Centaurs.

== Sources ==
- Isabelle Lemaistre, et al., Skulptur aus dem Louvre. Sculptures françaises néo-classiques. 1760-1830, (exhibition catalog) Paris, Musée du Louvre, 1990
- Simone Hoog, Musée national de Versailles. Les sculptures. I - Le musée, preface by Jean-Pierre Babelon, with the collaboration Roland Brossard, Paris, Réunion des Musées Nationaux, 1993.
- Guilhem Scherf, "Une statuette en terre cuite de Jean-Baptiste Stouf au Nationalmuseum", In: Art Bulletin of the Nationalmuseum Stockholm, vol. 20, 2013, pgs.27-36 (Online).
