= Pierre Stenne =

French sculptor (1893–1967)

Pierre Stenne (1893 – 1967) was a French sculptor. Born in Boulogne-sur-Mer, his most notable works are the 1962 statue of Napoleon atop the Column of the Grande Armée in Wimille near Boulogne, the crucified Christ in the Le Gros Moulin church south of Audinghen and the original design for reliefs of the Old Contemptibles memorial in Boulogne (in the end produced by Félix-Alexandre Desruelles).
