= Palais Brongniart =

Building in Paris that housed the historical Paris stock exchange

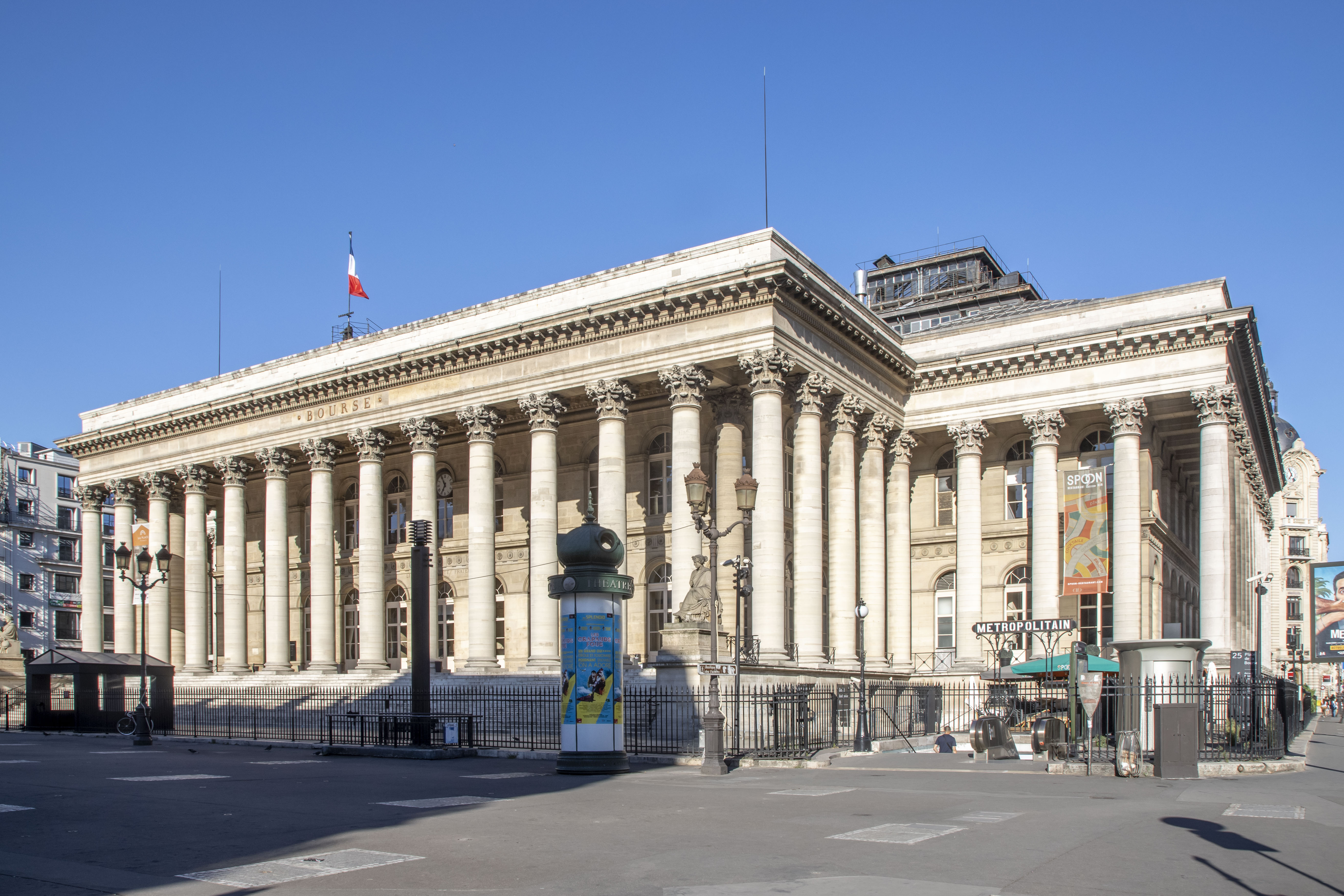

- Location within Paris

General information
- Architectural style: Neoclassical
- Location: 2nd arrondissement, Paris, France
- Coordinates: 48°52′09″N 2°20′29″E
- Construction started: 1808
- Completed: 1825 (opening)
- Inaugurated: 4 November 1826
- Owner: City of Paris

Design and construction
- Architects: Alexandre-Théodore Brongniart; Éloi Labarre

Website
- https://www.palaisbrongniart.com/

The Palais Brongniart (French pronunciation: [palɛ bʁɔ̃ɲaʁ]; English: Brongniart Palace) is a building in Paris that was built at the direction of Napoleon in the early 19th century to house the Paris stock exchange (French: Bourse de Paris). It is located at the Place de la Bourse, in the 2nd arrondissement in central Paris. It was named after its initial architect, Alexandre-Théodore Brongniart, who died in 1813 prior to its completion. The Palais Brongniart is nowadays used as an events centre, since the trading floor relocated in 1987, followed in 2004 by the last financial institution that was still housed there.

== Early history ==
Historically, stock trading took place at several spots in Paris, including rue Quincampoix, rue Vivienne (near the Palais Royal), and the back of the Opéra Garnier (the Paris opera house).

== Architecture ==
In the early 19th century, the Paris Bourse's activities found a stable location at the Palais Brongniart, or Palais de la Bourse, built to the designs of architect Alexandre-Théodore Brongniart from 1808 to 1813 and completed by Éloi Labarre from 1813 to 1826.

Brongniart had spontaneously submitted his project, which was a rectangular neoclassical Roman temple with a giant Corinthian colonnade enclosing a vaulted and arcaded central chamber. His designs were greatly admired by Napoleon and won Brongniart a major public commission at the end of his career. Initially praised, the building was later attacked for academic dullness. The authorities had required Brongniart to modify his designs, and after Brongniart's death in 1813, Labarre altered them even further, weakening Brongniart's original intentions. The interior decoration of the main trading room includes medallions featuring the names of the main other European stock exchanges at the time, grouped by geography in France (West and East) and elsewhere in Europe (North and South):

- West side: Bordeaux, Nantes, Rouen, Le Havre
- North side: London, Amsterdam, Basel, Frankfurt, Hamburg, Leipzig, Vienna, Saint Petersburg
- East side: Lille, Strasbourg, Lyon, Marseille
- South side: Naples, Trieste, Leghorn, Milan, Genoa, Barcelona, Cádiz, Lisbon

From 1901 to 1905, Jean-Baptiste-Frederic Cavel designed the addition of two lateral wings, resulting in a cruciform plan with innumerable columns. According to the architectural historian Andrew Ayers, these alterations "did nothing to improve the reputation of this uninspiring monument."

== Operations ==
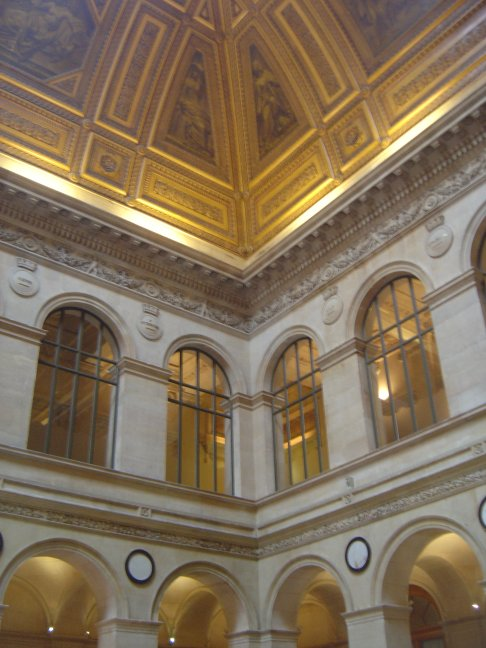
Main hall inside the Palais Brongniart

From the second half of the 19th century, official stock markets in Paris were operated by the Compagnie des agents de change, directed by the elected members of a stockbrokers' syndical council. The number of dealers in each of the different trading areas of the Bourse was limited. There were around 60 agents de change (the official stockbrokers). An agent de change had to be a French citizen, be nominated by a former agent or his estate, and be approved by the Minister of Finance, and he was appointed by decree of the President of the Republic. Officially, the agents de change could not trade for their own account nor even be a counterpart to someone who wanted to buy or sell securities with their aid; they were strictly brokers, that is, intermediaries. In the financial literature, the Paris Bourse is hence referred to as order-driven market, as opposed to quote-driven markets or dealer markets, where price-setting is handled by a dealer or market-maker. In Paris, only agents de change could receive a commission, at a rate fixed by law, for acting as an intermediary. However, parallel arrangements were usual in order to favor some clients' quote. The Commodities Exchange was housed in the same building until 1889, when it moved to the present Bourse de commerce. Moreover, until about the middle of the 20th century, a parallel market known as "La Coulisse" was in operation.

Until the late 1980s, the market operated as an open outcry exchange, with the agents de change meeting on the exchange floor of the Palais Brongniart. In 1986, the Paris Bourse started to implement an electronic trading system. This was known generically as CATS (Computer Assisted Trading System), but the Paris version was called CAC (Cotation Assistée en Continu). By 1989, quotations were fully automated. The Palais Brongniart hosted the French financial derivatives exchanges MATIF and MONEP, until they were fully automated in 1998. In the late 1990s, the Paris Bourse launched the Euronext initiative, an alliance of several European stock exchanges.

For the 2024 Summer Olympics and 2024 Summer Paralympics hosted in Paris, the building served as the Team USA House. The site was open to ticketed members of the public and included food, shops, and multiple areas to watch the games.

== See also ==
- List of works by James Pradier External sculpture
- Tribunal de commerce de Paris, hosted in the Palais Brongniart from 1826 to 1865
