= Alexandre Brongniart =

French scientist (1770 – 1847)

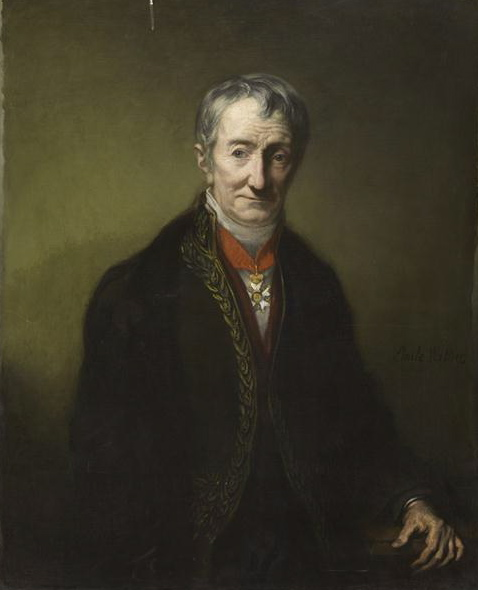
- Portrait of Alexandre Brongniart by Emile-Charles Wattier, 1847
- Born: 5 February 1770; Paris, Kingdom of France
- Died: 7 October 1847 (aged 77); Paris, Kingdom of France
- Scientific career
- Fields: Chemistry; Mineralogy; Zoology
- Workplaces: Sèvres - Cité de la céramique Manufacture nationale de Sèvres; Royal Swedish Academy of Sciences

Alexandre Brongniart (French: [alɛksɑ̃dʁ bʁɔ̃ɲaʁ]; 5 February 1770 – 7 October 1847) was a French chemist, mineralogist, geologist, paleontologist, and zoologist, who collaborated with Georges Cuvier on a study of the geology of the region around Paris. Observing fossil content as well as lithology in sequences, he classified Tertiary formations and was responsible for defining 19th century geological studies as a subject of science by assembling observations and classifications.

Brongniart was also the founder of the Musée national de Céramique-Sèvres (National Museum of Ceramics), having been director of the Sèvres Porcelain Factory from 1800 to 1847.

== Life ==
He was born in Paris, the son of the architect Alexandre-Théodore Brongniart and father of the botanist Adolphe-Théodore Brongniart.

In 1788, he co-founded the French Philomathic Society of Paris.

In 1797, he became an instructor of natural history at the Central School of the Four Nations, and became the professor of mineralogy in 1822 at the Museum of Natural History in Paris.

He was appointed in 1800 by Napoleon's minister of the interior Lucien Bonaparte director of the revitalized porcelain manufactory at Sèvres, holding this role until death. The young man took to the position a combination of his training as a scientist— especially as a mining engineer relevant to the chemistry of ceramics— his managerial talents and financial acumen and his cultivated understanding of neoclassical esthetic. He remained in charge of Sèvres, through regime changes, for 47 years.

Brongniart introduced a new classification of reptiles and wrote several treatises on mineralogy and the ceramic arts. He also made an extensive study of trilobites and made pioneering contributions to stratigraphy by developing fossil markers for dating strata.

He was elected a member of the American Philosophical Society in 1819 and a foreign member of the Royal Swedish Academy of Sciences in 1823.

== Work ==
In his early ages, Brongniart focused on the studies of reptiles and published Essai d'une classification naturelle des reptiles in 1800, which he compared the anatomy of reptiles in order to classify them into different groups. The four classifications were Chelonia, Sauria, Ophidia and Batrachia. However, even-though he classified Batrachia as a sub-class of Reptilia, Brongniart noticed a huge difference in the anatomy of Batrachia compared to the rest of the class. This problem was resolved in 1804 by Pierre Latreille by replacing Batrachia into a class called Amphibians, and the rest of the Reptilia grouping was retained. Therefore, Batrachians is the only group that is no longer recognized as reptiles as they are amphibians.

Paris Map that Brongniart and Cuvier used to study the strata around Paris area.

The most significant geological work for Brongniart was Essai sur la géographie minéralogique des environs de Paris in collaboration with Georges Cuvier on studies of geology around Paris in 1811. At the time, Cuvier was trying to figure out the periods the fossils were from and to reconstruct the extinct mammals based on the periods they were from. Their paper "Essai sur la géographie minéralogique des environs de Paris" identified nine formations that had been formed over a very long period of time. The formations, starting with the oldest, were called the Chalk, Argile Plastique, Calcaire grossier, Calcaire silicieux, Formation gypseuse, Sabels et Gres marins, Gres sans coquilliers, Terrain d’eau douce, and Limon d’aterrissement. Brongniart found that some of the strata had marine mollusk fossils, and some had fresh water mollusk fossils. He used the alternation of these marine and fresh water layers to disprove the theory that strata were deposited by a shrinking ocean. The paper was first read to the public in April 1808 but was extended in June 1808 and later on 1811. They were among the first people to study the earth by its fossil content instead of relying on the characteristics of rocks. During the collaboration, they also found evidences against Abraham Werner's Neptunism. The results triggered Cuvier into creating catastrophism.

Another significant contribution in stratigraphy was using the fossil content in the strata he examined in Paris to identify strata in other locations instead of depth or lithology, as rocks can not be expected to have the exact same characteristics or depth if deposited under different conditions.

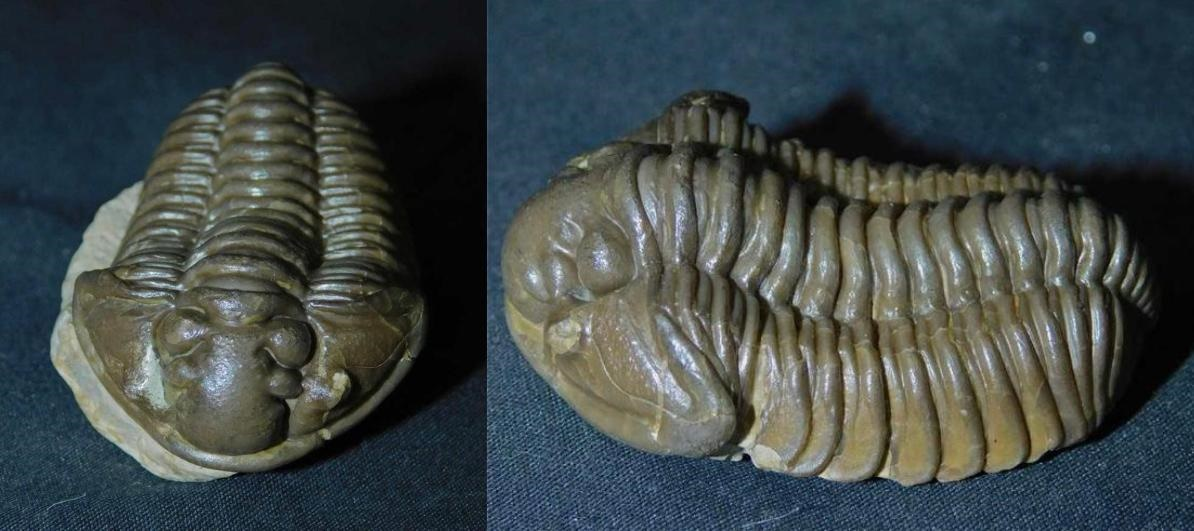
The Silurian trilobite Calymene blumenbachii Brongn.; Brongniart in Desmarest, 1817. From the Much Wenlock Limestone Formation, Homerian Stage, Wenlock Series, Dudley, West Midlands, UK.

In 1822, Brongniart published the first full-length study of trilobites in which he classified a variety from Europe and North America and tried to group them based on age. This work contributed to later work on Paleozoic stratigraphy.

Whilst at Sèvres, he developed a mathematical formula to determine the dry material content of ceramic slips; this has become to be known as Brongniart's formula.

== Publications ==
- Essai d'une classification naturelle des reptiles (1800)
- Mémoires de l’Institut de France (1806)
- Traité Élémentaire de Minéralogie (1807)
- Essai sur la géographie minéralogique des environs de Paris (1811)
- Annales du Museum d’Histoire Naturelle (1811)
- Mémoires de l’Institut Impérial de France (1811)
- Sur les terrains qui paraissent avoir été formés sous l’eau douce (1810)
- Histoire naturelle des crustacés fossiles, sous les rapports zoologiques et géologiques (1822)
- Mémoire sur les terrains de sédiment supérieurs calcaro-trappéens du Vicentin, et sur qui peuvent se rapporter à la même époque (1823)
- Classification et caractères minéralogiques des roches homogènes et hétérogènes (1827)

== Family ==
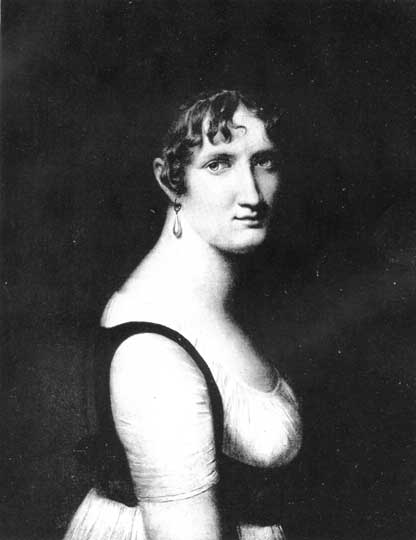
Mme Alexandre Brongniart, née Cécile Coquebert de Montbret, 1800, by Jeanne-Elisabeth Chaudet.

His wife was Cecile Coquebert de Montbret (1782–1862), the daughter of the French consul to England, Charles-Etienne Coquebert de Montbret. They had three children together. Their son, Adolphe-Théodore Brongniart, became a major figure in the study of paleobotany. Their daughter Hermine (1803–1890) married Jean Baptiste Dumas, and their other daughter Mathilde (1808–1882) married Jean Victoir Audouin.

== Bibliography ==
- Brongniart, Alex., Essai d'une classification naturelle des Reptiles. in: Millin, Magas. encycl. V. 6. 1799. p. 184–201. – (Mit Abbildgn. [Abbildungen]) Bulletin des Sciences, par la Société Philomatique. II, an 8. p. 81–82. 89–91.
  Essai d'une classification naturelle des Reptiles. (Mit 2 Taf. [Tafeln]) in: Mém. prés. à l'Inst. Sciences math. et phys. Tom. 1. 1805. p. 587–637.
- By HathiTrust () it's something like:
  Alex. Brongniart: Essai d'une classification naturelle des reptiles<|!-- , par le citoyen Alex. Brongniart --|>. In: Bulletin des sciences, par la Sociéte philomathatique [de Paris?]. [Tom. II?] Paris, pluviose, an 8 de la République [Rainfull (5th month of the French Republic), year 8 of the Republic], No. 35, p. 81–82 & ventose, an 8 de la République [Windfull (6th month of the French Republic), year 8 of the Republic], No. 36, p. 89–91.

-->

- Alexandre Brongniart: Essai d'une classification naturelle des reptiles. In: Magasin encyclopédique, ou journal des sciences, des lettres et des arts; rédigé par A. L. Millin. V. année. Tome sixième. Paris, an VIII [year 8 (of the Republic)] – 1799, p. 184–201 (HathiTrust).
- Brongniart, A. 1800. Essai d'une classification naturelle des reptiles. Bulletin de la Société Philomatique. 2 (36): 89–91.
- Alexandre Brongniart: Essai d'une classification naturelle des reptiles. In: Mémoires présentés a l'Institut des Sciences, lettres et arts, par divers savans, et lus dans ses assemblées. Sciences mathématiques et physiques. Tome premier. Paris, frimaire an XIV [frimaire year 14 (of the Republic)] = 1805, p. 587–637 (HathiTrust).
- Brongniart, Alexandre (January 1854). Traité des arts céramiques, ou des poteries considérées dans leur histoire, leur pratique et leur théorie (2nd ed.). Paris: Béchet jeune.
