= Column of the Grande Armée =

Coordinates: 50°44′28.28″N 1°37′06.00″E

- Colonne de la Grande Armée
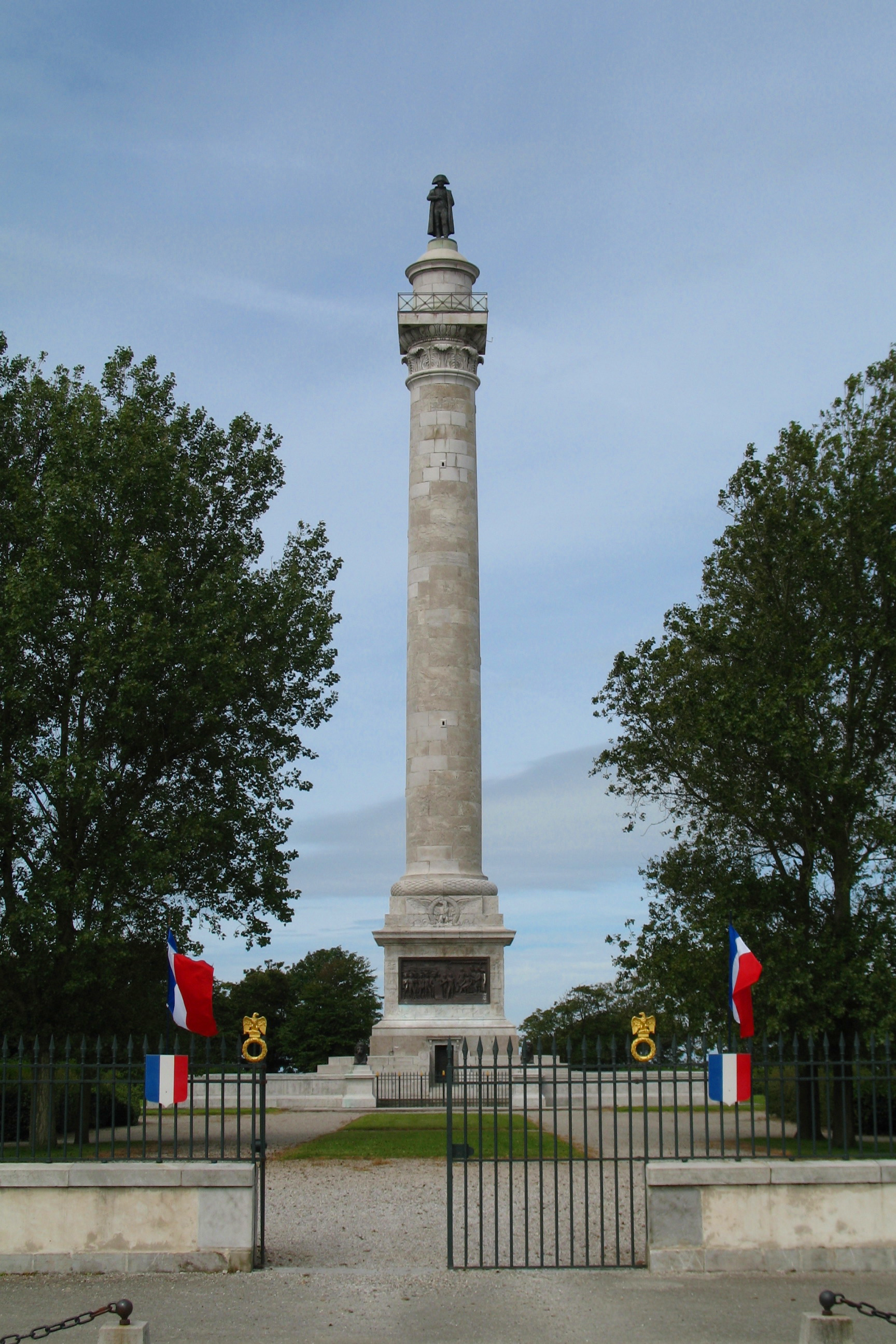
- Column in 2007
- Interactive map of Column of the Grande Armée
- Location: Wimille, Pas-de-Calais, France
- Designer: Étienne-Éloi Labarre
- Type: Victory column
- Material: Marble
- Height: 54m
- Visitors: 13,000 (in 2022)
- Beginning date: 1804
- Completion date: 1841
- Opening date: August 15, 1841
- Dedicated to: Grande Armée
- Website: https://www.colonne-grande-armee.fr

The Column of the Grande Armée (French - Colonne de la grande Armée or Colonne Napoléone) is a 53 metre high Corinthian order triumphal column (modelled on Trajan's Column and other triumphal columns in Rome) on the Rue Napoleon in Wimille, near Boulogne-sur-Mer, France.

== History ==
=== To 1815 ===
The column was intended to commemorate a successful invasion of England (an invasion that never occurred). In September 1804, Marshal Soult informed the emperor of the army's wish to erect such a column and for its site the town of Boulogne bought the estate of the old royalist, the widow Delahodde-Fourcroy, who reluctantly ceded her field for a monument to the man she called "the usurper". The commission created for its construction took on the architect Étienne-Éloi Labarre, the bronze-caster Houdon and Jean Guillaume Moitte for the bas-reliefs, and the army, flotilla, soldiers, sailors and sous-officiers all gave a half-day's pay to the project (with the officers giving a full day's pay) once a month. Today, since the invasion of England never took place, the column instead commemorates the first distribution of the Imperial Légion d'honneur at the "camp de Boulogne", by Napoleon to the soldiers of the Army of England.

The first stone was put in place by Soult on 18 Brumaire, year 13 (9 October 1804), amidst great festivities and awards of decorations. The stone was sourced from local Marquis marble. The descriptions by C.P. Brard (1808) of the marbles of the Département of the Pas-de-Calais includes the following quotation:

"What gave [me] the chance to discover this marble was this column that the troops of the camp de Saint-Omer voted to be erected to the glory of the Emperor at Boulogne, on the sea edge, after a great victory; then they searched to find the right materials and after several searches, Monsieur Piron discovered this marble"

In the 1808 edition he adds that Monsieur Piron then

"rushed to give the name of Napoleon to his quarry and to the marble which it had led him to"

After the invasion force became the Grande Armée on 16 August 1804 and left Boulogne, work on the column became slow and erratic. On 3 December 1811, with the statue and bas-reliefs still waiting in Paris and the column having reached only 20 of its planned 50 metres, the building site had to close since the project had run out of funds and was 140,000 francs in debt (1 million francs had already been used up, and another million would be spent before completion). Work stopped completely in 1814 on Napoleon's fall and the statues and bas-reliefs were broken up and melted down with the bronze of the Napoleon statue from the Place Vendôme column for the Pont Neuf statue of Henry IV of France.

=== 1819-1853 ===
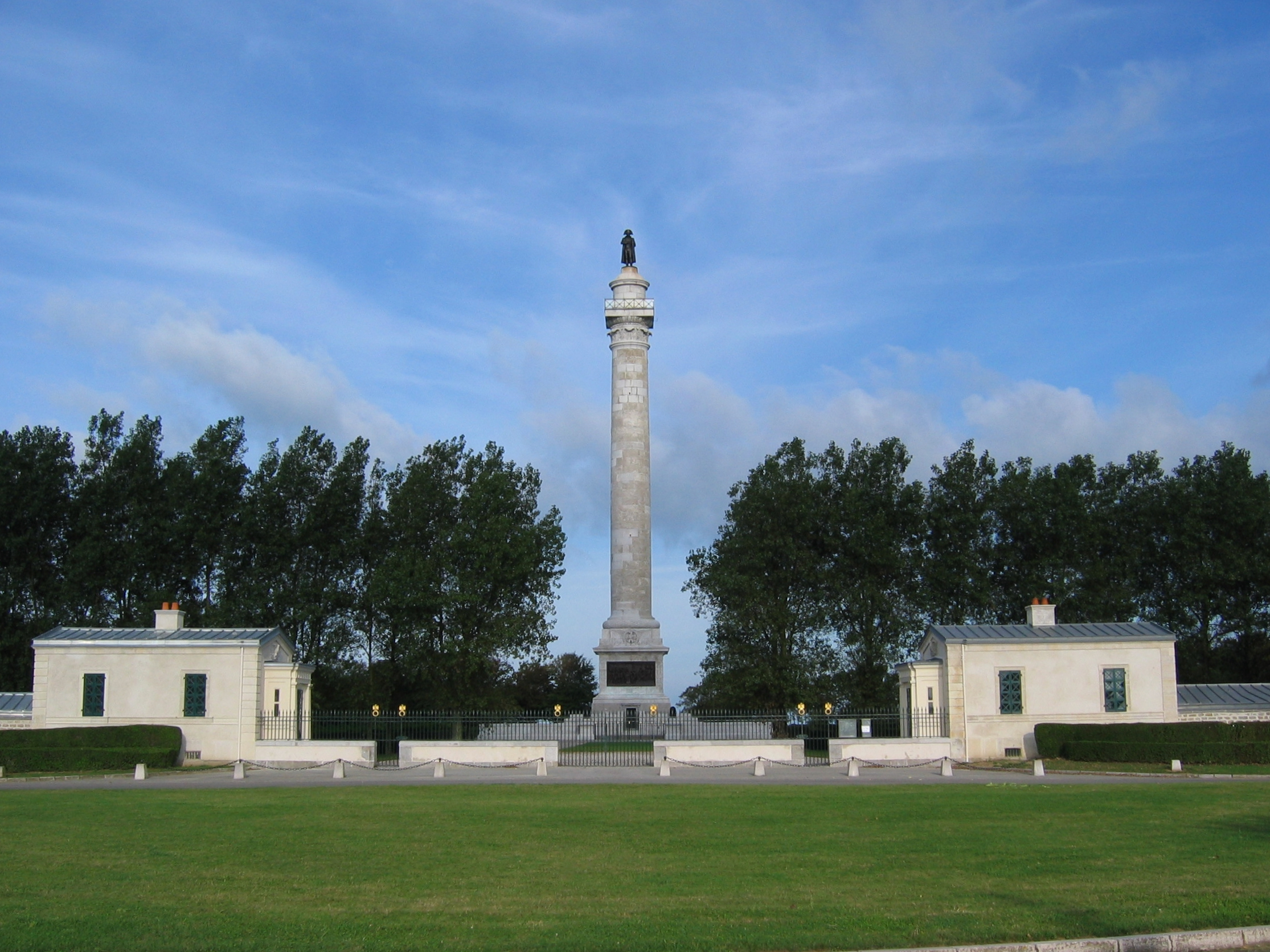
The Column of the Grande Armée, with its flanking pavilions

Despite Napoleon's final defeat with the Grand Armee in 1815 and an invasion of England that never took place, work on the column restarted in 1819 when the French minister of the interior allocated it 30,000 francs, with additional credits granted in 1820. The platform on the top was put in place in 1821 and a royal globe crowned with fleurs de lys and a royal crown placed on top of that in 1823. After the regime change of the July Revolution, in 1831 the column was voted 10,000 francs for maintenance, the crown was removed and the fleurs de lys replaced by stars.

In 1831 the column was first named the Column of the Grande Armée and (also that year) it was climbed by queen Hortense and her son Louis-Napoléon (later Napoleon III). In 1838 it was decided to complete the works - François Joseph Bosio was charged with casting a new statue of the emperor and Lemaire and Théophile Bra new bas-reliefs - and in June that year marshal Soult was officially received at the column by the Boulogne National Guard, having not seen the column since 1805. In a failed coup of 1840 Louis-Napoleon landed a small body of his supporters at Boulogne, and ended up taking refuge in the park around the column and raising the imperial flag atop it, before fleeing to the beach, where he was arrested.

In the meantime Bosio's statue of Napoleon in his coronation costume (costing 60,000 francs and weighing 7,500 kilos) was completed in time for the return of Napoleon's ashes to Paris on 15 December 1840 and exhibited on the banks of the Seine, leaving Paris for Wimille on 21 July 1841. It arrived at the Column amidst great celebration on 26 July - old soldiers were seen to weep and touch the statue's hands - and placed on its top by the future Napoleon III on 15 August in the presence of 50,000 people, with a special medallion being cast for the occasion (though the bas-reliefs were not added until 1843). Punch on 28 August 1841 noted that the new statue had "been turned, by design or accident, with its back to England" and commented:

Upon its lofty column's stand,

Napoleon takes his place;

His back still turned upon that land

That never saw his face.

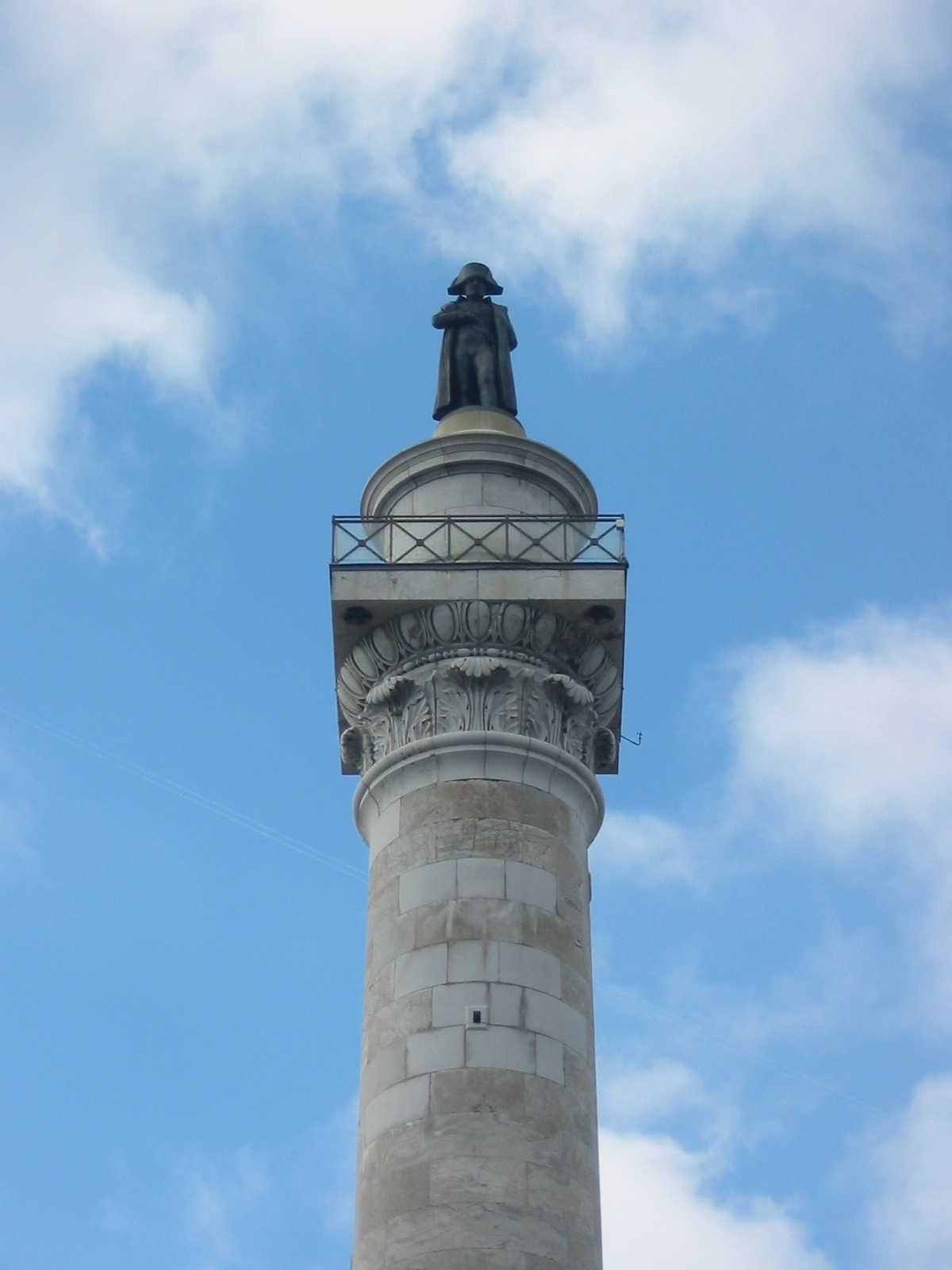
The top of the Column of the Grande Armée today

Napoleon III and his empress arrived at Boulogne on 27 September 1853 and he immediately gave orders to build an avenue leading up to the column (though this was demolished in the 1970s). In anticipation of the Crimean War he gathered 10,000 troops on the Boulogne coast and held a major troop review in the famous Terlincthun valley and plain on 30 September 1854 before the newly restored stela or "pierre napoléone" of the monument to the Légion d'honneur (inaugurated by Boulogne's société d'agriculture et des arts on 3 December 1809, vandalised by ultra-royalists in 1815 and reinaugurated on 24 October 1830).

=== 1901-present ===
The column was declared a monument historique on 31 March 1905 and survived the First World War intact. The column and the 1841 statue were seriously damaged by bombing in 1944, with the park around the column being turned into a German naval cemetery (with burials including that of Klaus Dönitz, son of admiral Karl Dönitz, in 1944). The original statue was replaced by a 4.75m high statue of Napoleon in chasseur uniform by Pierre Stenne). The new statue and the completed restoration works were inaugurated on 24 June 1962, in the presence of Charles de Gaulle, a troop detachment and a large crowd. The column's top was struck by lightning on 19 November 1999 (causing very severe cracks and the fall of some blocks of marble, though the statue survived) and again 2002. The restoration is now complete making it possible once again to climb the Column.

== Description ==
There is a pavilion to either side of the statue's base, and in the right-hand one is a free museum, housing the 1841 statue, now restored. The bas-relief on one side of the base, by Bra, shows the presentation of the plans for the column to Napoleon by Soult, with general Bertrand beside Soult and admiral Bruix behind Soult. The bas relief on the other side, by Lemaire, shows the first award of the Légion d'honneur on 16 August 1804, and also shows Soult, Lacépède, Louis Belmas (the archbishop of Cambrai) and Hugues-Robert-J.-Ch. De La Tour d'Auvergne Lauragais (the bishop of Arras) beside Napoleon. The base houses an archive room containing copies of the busts of Napoleon. Guarding the entrance to the base are two bronze lions sculpted by Jean-Guillaume Moitte, and the base is surrounded by railings decorated with the golden French Imperial eagle.

== Sources ==
- This page is a translation of Colonne de la grande Armée on French Wikipedia
