= Alexandre-Théodore Brongniart =

French architect

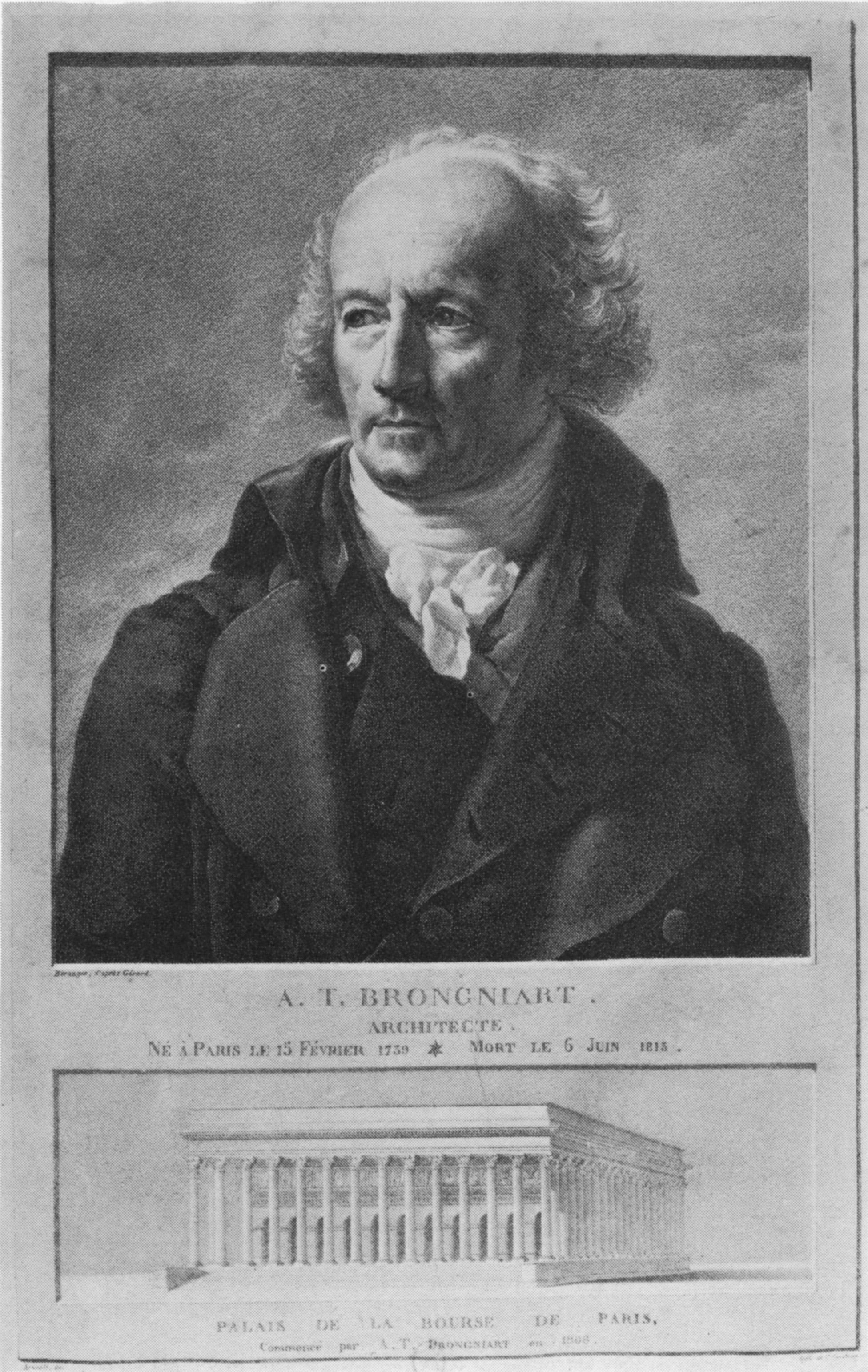
- Alexandre-Théodore Brongniart with his design for the Paris Bourse (1808)
- Born: 15 February 1739; Paris, Kingdom of France
- Died: 6 June 1813 (aged 74); Paris, French Empire
- Occupation: Architect
- Spouse(s): Anne Louise Brongniart, née Degrémont (1744–1829)
- Children: Alexandre Brongniart; Louise Théodore Brongniart 1772–1845; Emilie Louise Alexandrine Brongniart 1780–1847

Alexandre-Théodore Brongniart (French pronunciation: [alɛksɑ̃dʁ teɔdɔʁ bʁɔ̃ɲaʁ]; 15 February 1739 – 6 June 1813) was a prominent French architect, born in Paris.

== Biography ==
In 1767, Alexandre-Théodore Brongniart married Anne Louise Degrémont (1744–1829). The couple became friends of the royal portrait painter, Marie Louise Élisabeth Vigée-Lebrun who painted the portrait of their daughter, Emilie Louise Alexandrine Brongniart (1780–1847) that now hangs in the National Gallery in London, known as Mademoiselle Brongniart, 1788. During the Reign of Terror, Vigée-Lebrun hid in Brongniart's home before fleeing the country.

Alexandre-Théodore Brongniart was also a close friend of Jean Antoine Houdon, the pre-eminent French sculptor of the day who sculpted busts of his daughter Alexandrine-Emilie and his son Alexandre Jr. that are now in the Louvre Museum in Paris.

Alexandre-Théodore Brongniart designed several hôtels particuliers, including the Hôtel de Bourbon-Condé and the Hotel de Monaco. In 1781, he was received as a member of the Académie Royale d'Architecture, and in 1782, he was named architect and controller-general of the Ecole Militaire (Military School). In the same year, he refurbished the Hôtel de Besenval. In 1804, he was commissioned by Napoleon Bonaparte to create the layout for the famous Père Lachaise Cemetery. The Emperor was so pleased with his work that in 1807, he chose Brongniart to design the Paris Bourse (the Parisian stock exchange). Brongniart did all of the designs, but it would be his last work and he would not live to see the classical Greek styled building completed in 1825. The building was named "Palais Brongniart" in his honor and remains in use to this day.

Alexandre-Théodore Brongniart died in Paris in 1813 and was interred there in the cemetery he had designed.

== Family ==
Alexandre-Théodore Brongniart and his wife Anne Louise had three children. Their son Alexandre went on to become a respected geologist and director of the famous Sèvres porcelain factory. His son, and therefore grandson of Alexandre-Théodore Brongniart, Adolphe-Théodore Brongniart, became a famous botanist known as the father of paleobotany and a recipient of the Wollaston Medal in science text.

== Gallery ==
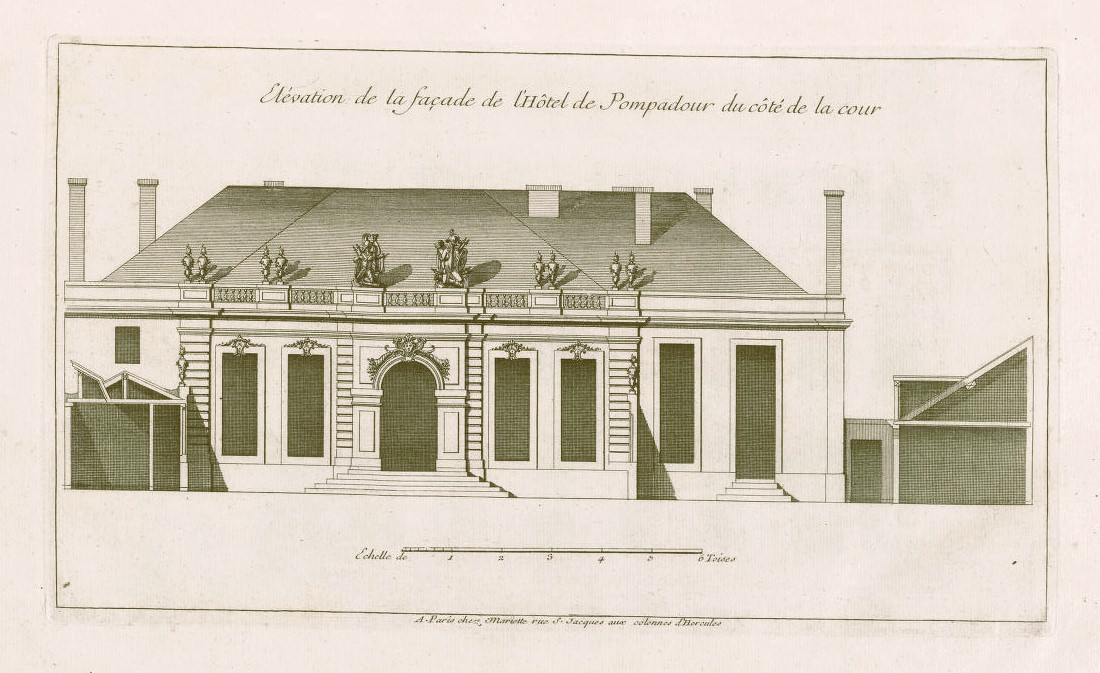
Hôtel de Besenval, Paris (1704). Renovation and construction of the nymphaeum by Alexandre-Théodore Brongniart in 1782

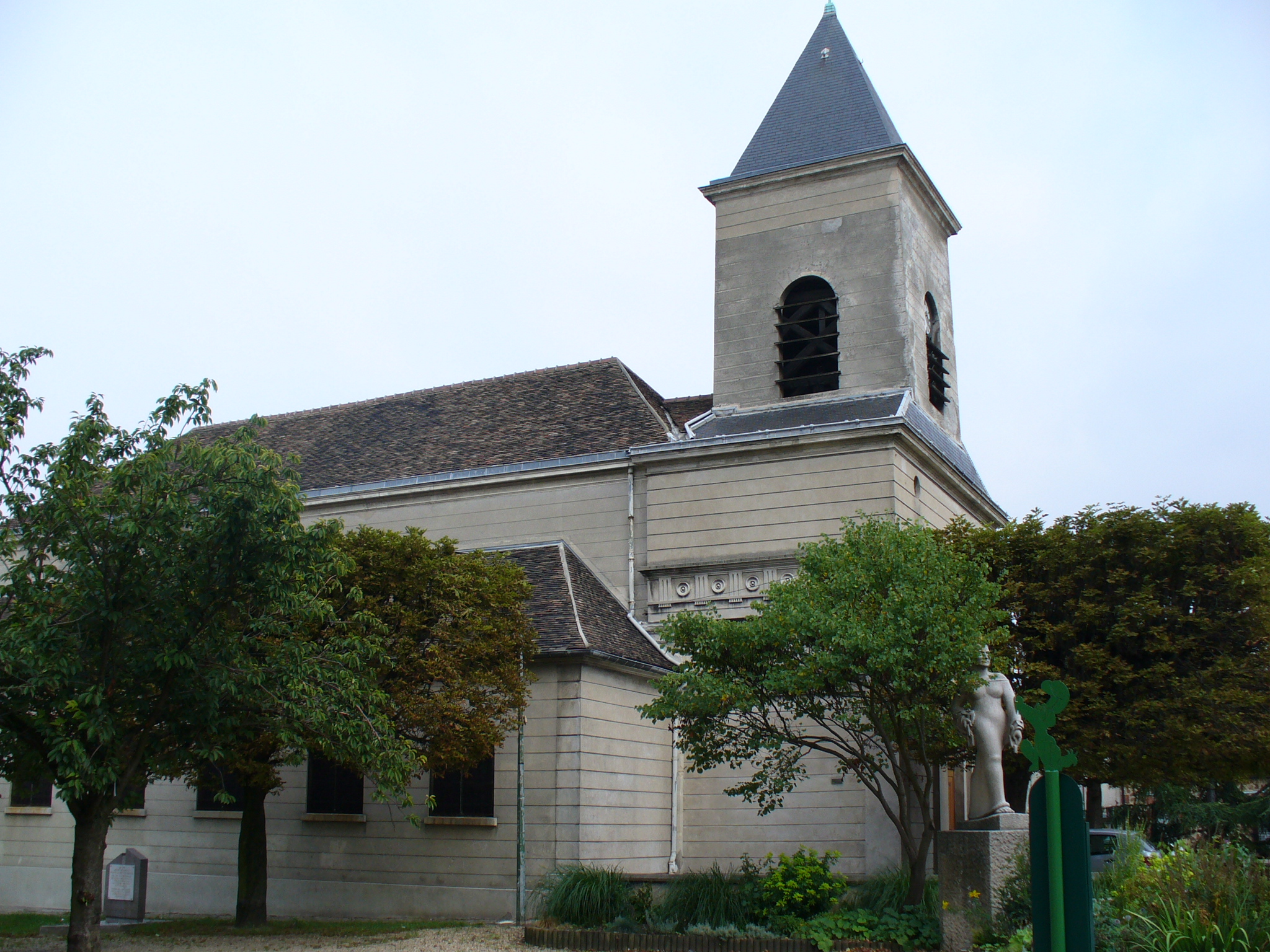
Église Saint-Germain-l'Auxerrois, Romainville (1787)

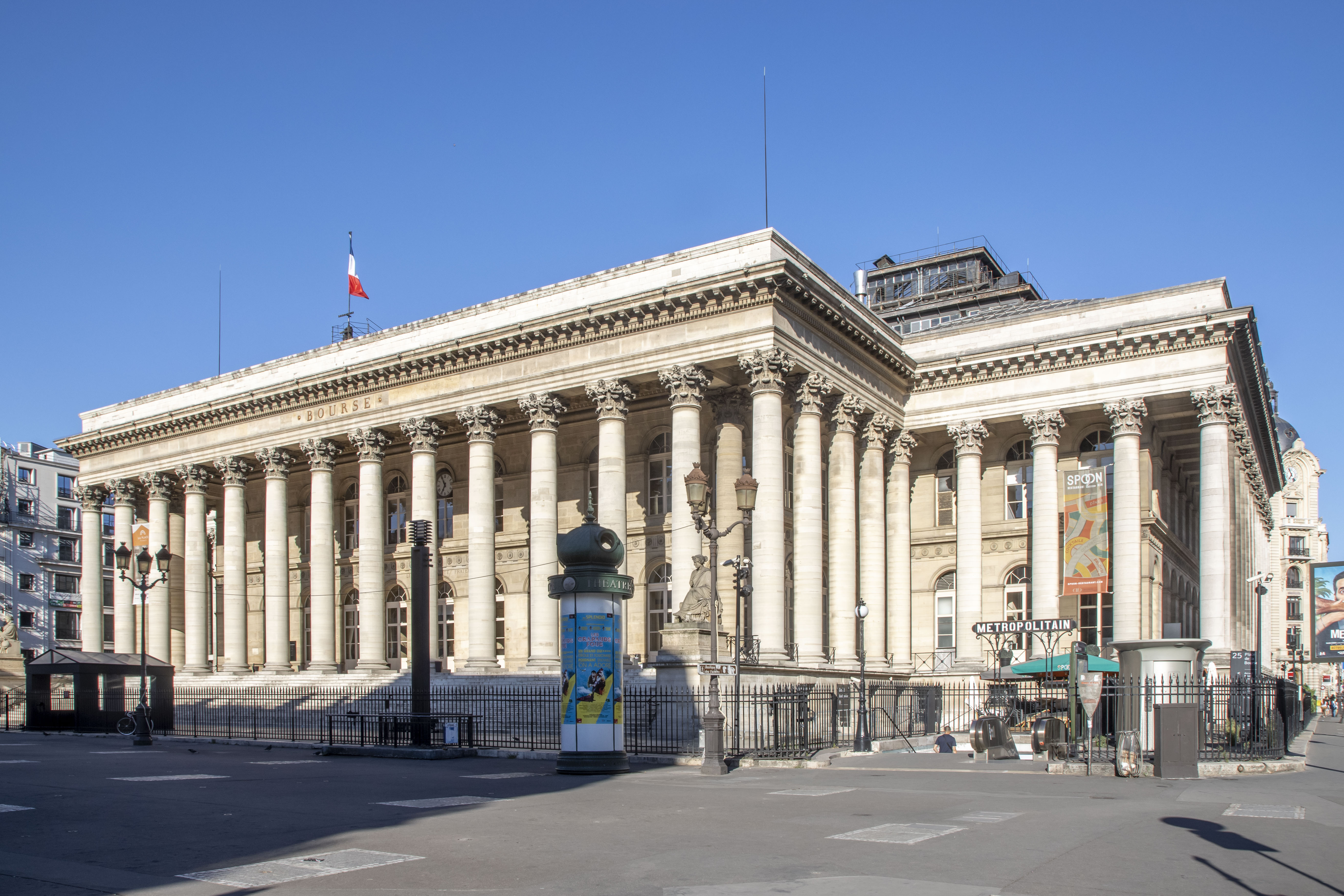
Palais Brongniart, Paris (1808)

== Bibliography ==
- Anonymous (1996). "Brongniart, Alexandre-Théodore", vol. 4, pp. 847–848, in The Dictionary of Art, 34 volumes, edited by Jane Turner. New York: Grove. ISBN 9781884446009. Also at Oxford Art Online (subscription required).
- Le Bas, Philippe, editor (1840). France. Dictionnaire encyclopédique, volume 1 (A–Az). Paris: Didot Frères. See the article "Académie d'architecture", pp. 82–85 (at Google Books).
