= Pierre-Etienne Moitte =

French printer-engraver

- Born: 1 January 1722; Paris, France
- Died: 4 September 1780 (aged 58); Paris, France

Pierre-Etienne Moitte (1 January 1722 – 4 September 1780) was a French painter-engraver.

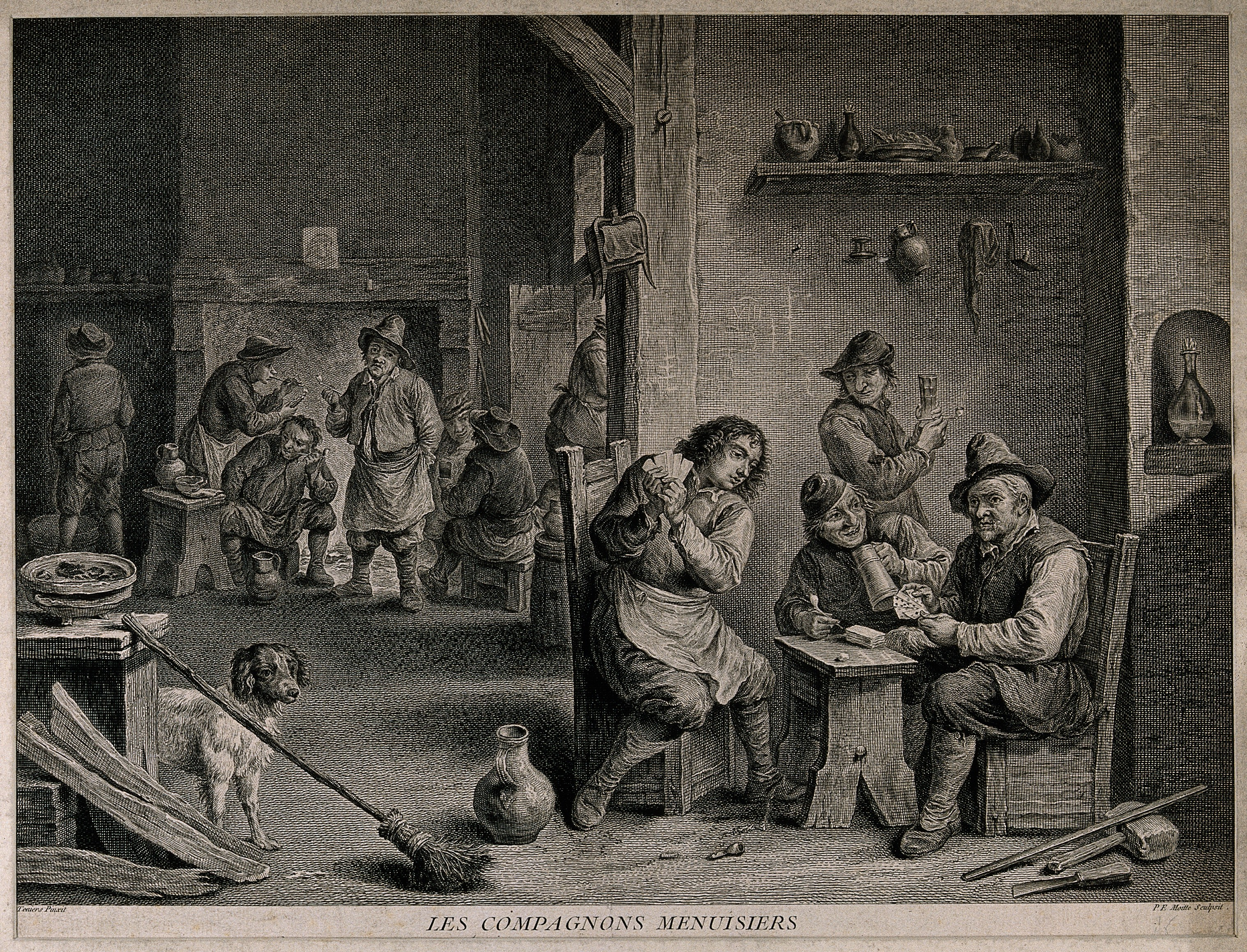
Engraving after David Teniers II

Moitte was born in Paris. He became a painter who is better known today for his engravings after old masters. His son Alexandre Moitte (1750-1828) also became a painter.

Moitte died in Paris.
