= Robert-Joseph Auguste =

French goldsmith and sculptor

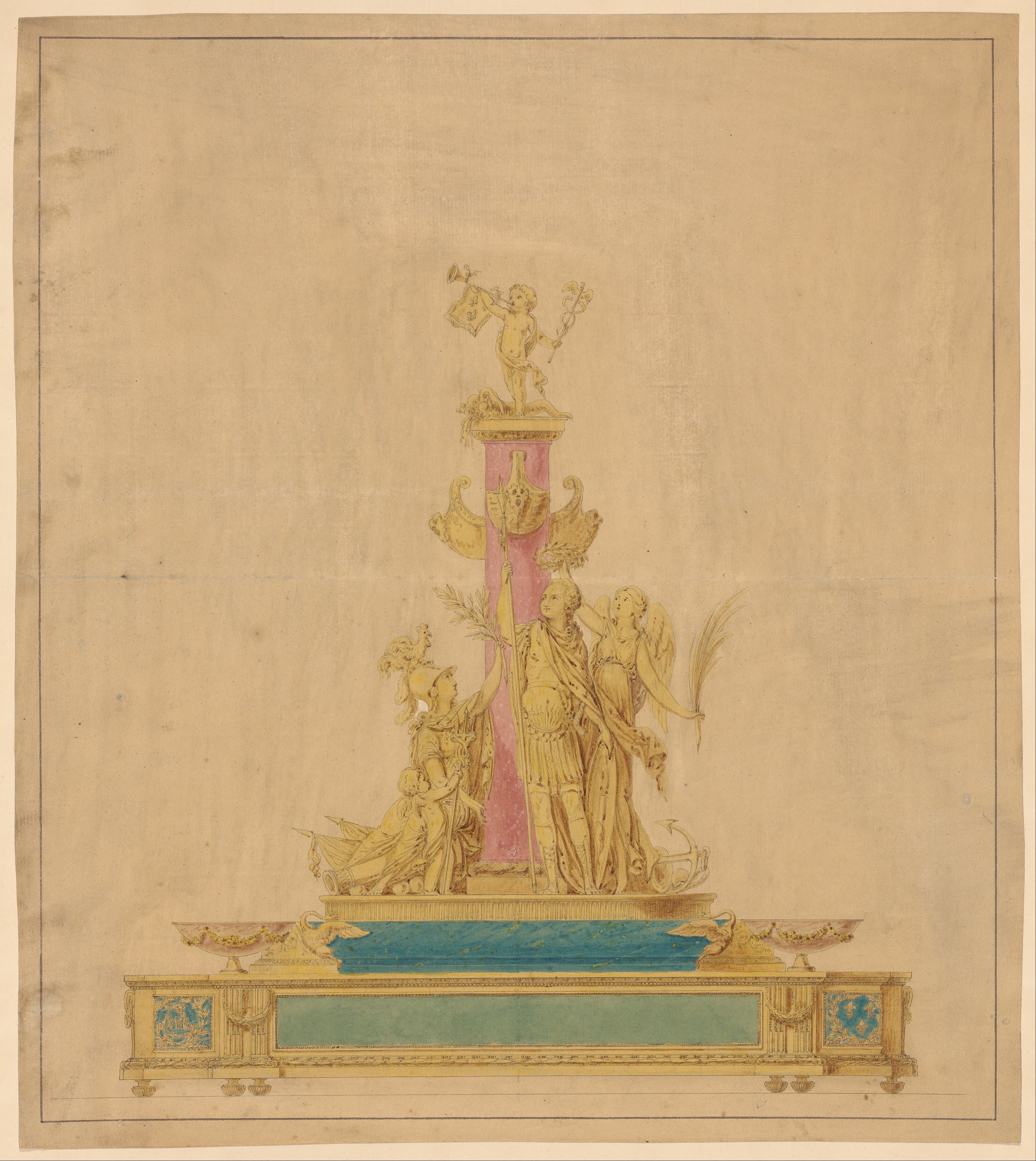
Drawing attributed to Robert-Joseph Auguste.

Robert-Joseph Auguste (1723 – ca1805) was a sculptor and royal goldsmith to the French kings Louis XV and Louis XVI, whose coronation crown he made.

Without a formal apprenticeship, Auguste was enabled to pursue his vocation by royal license, as an artist suivant le cour: he was often commissioned for works by the kings of France. Extensive silver services were delivered over several years for George III of Great Britain, beginning in 1776, and for Catherine the Great of Russia. Auguste was one of the first Parisian goldsmiths to create pieces in the Neoclassical style.

In addition to silver and gold, he modeled work that was cast in bronze and gilded, such as the mounts on a porphyry vase and cover in the Wallace Collection, London.

His son Henri Auguste assumed control of the family workshop in 1784–85.
