= Wimille =

- Commune
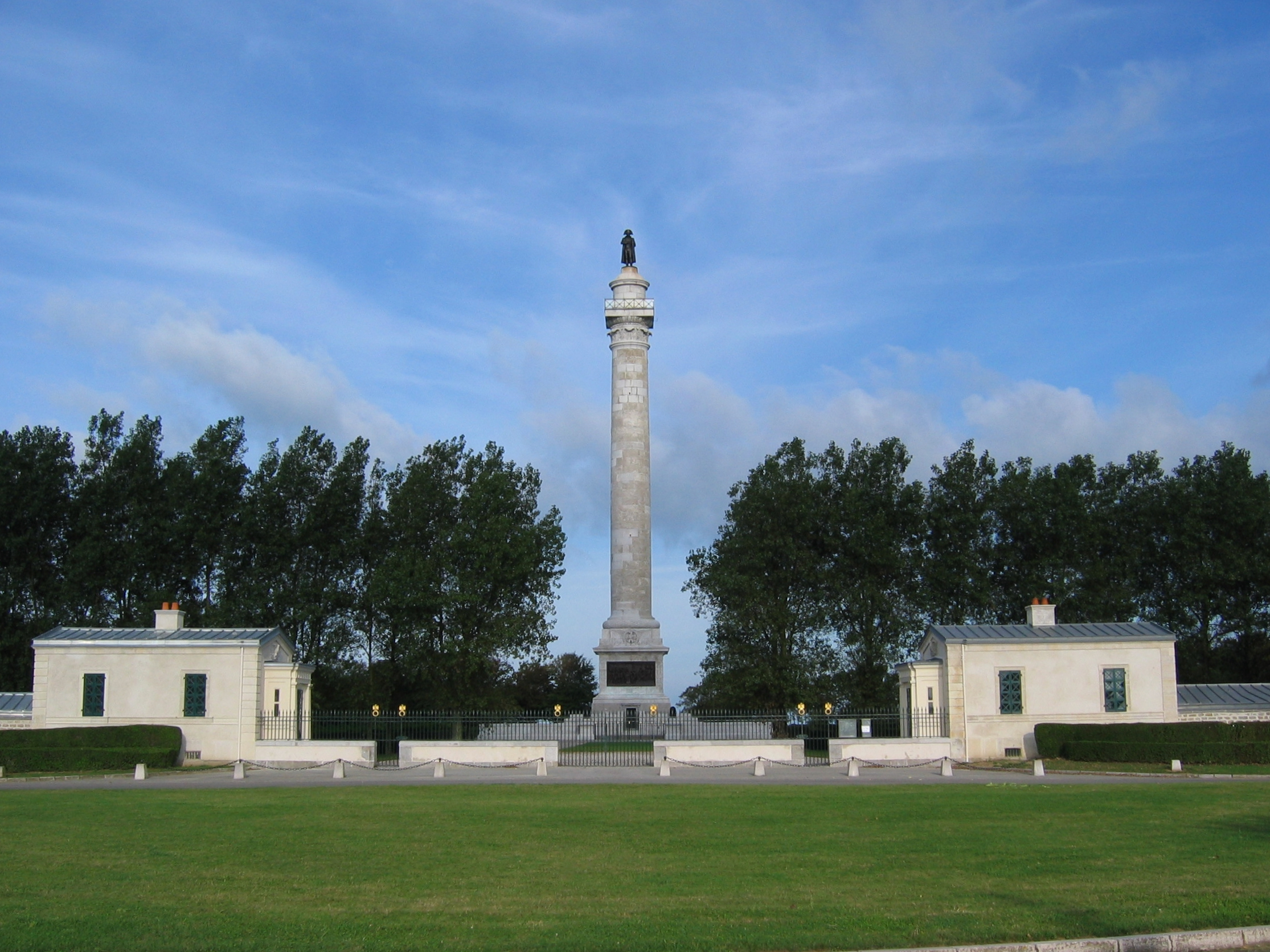
- Column of the Grande Armée

- Coat of arms
- Location of Wimille
- Location within France Location within Hauts-de-France
- Coordinates: 50°45′50″N 1°38′01″E
- Country: France
- Region: Hauts-de-France
- Department: Pas-de-Calais
- Arrondissement: Boulogne-sur-Mer
- Canton: Boulogne-sur-Mer-1
- Intercommunality: Boulonnais

Government
  - Mayor (2020–2026): Antoine Logié
- Area^{1}: 22.24 km^{2} (8.59 sq mi)
- Elevation: 26 m (85 ft)
- Highest elevation: 109 m (358 ft)
- Lowest elevation: 2 m (6.6 ft)
- Population (2023): 3,866
  - Density: 173.8/km^{2} (450.2/sq mi)
- Time zone: UTC+01:00 (CET)
  - Summer (DST): UTC+02:00 (CEST)
- INSEE/Postal code: 62894 /62126
- ^{1} French Land Register data, which excludes lakes, ponds, glaciers > 1 km^{2} (0.386 sq mi or 247 acres) and river estuaries.

Wimille (French pronunciation: [vimil]; Picard: Wimil) is a commune in the Pas-de-Calais department in the Hauts-de-France region of France about 3 miles (4.8 km) north of Boulogne, on the banks of the river Wimereux. The river Slack forms the northern boundary of the commune.

== Population ==
The inhabitants are called Wimillois in French.

Historical population
Year	Pop.	±% p.a.
1968	4,826	—
1975	4,779	−0.14%
1982	4,220	−1.76%
1990	4,681	+1.30%
1999	4,721	+0.09%
2007	4,367	−0.97%
2012	4,151	−1.01%
2017	4,083	−0.33%
2023	3,866	−0.91%
Source: INSEE

== Notable people ==
- Cecil Chesterton, journalist, buried at the Terlincthun British Cemetery
- Jean-François Pilâtre de Rozier, aviation pioneer, took off in a balloon there.
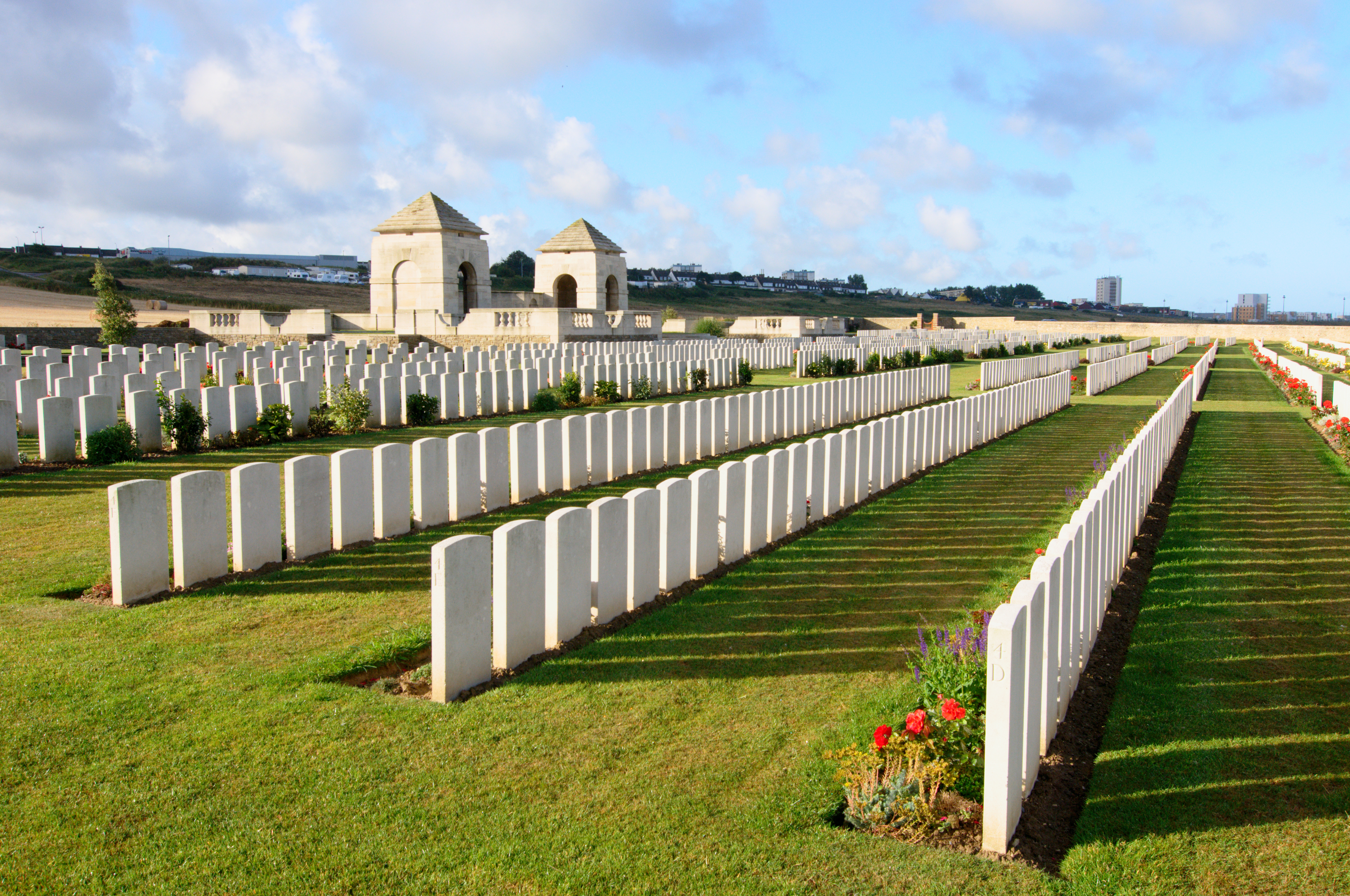
The Terlincthun British Cemetery

== See also ==
- Communes of the Pas-de-Calais department
