= Jean-Baptiste-Claude Odiot =

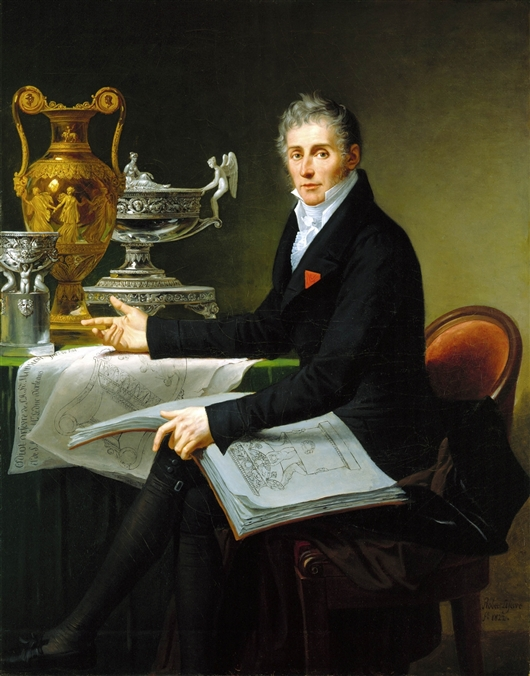
Odiot by Robert Lefèvre, 1822.

Jean-Baptiste-Claude Odiot (French: [ʒɑ̃ batist klod odjo]; 1763–1850) was a French silversmith working in the neoclassical style.

== Business ==
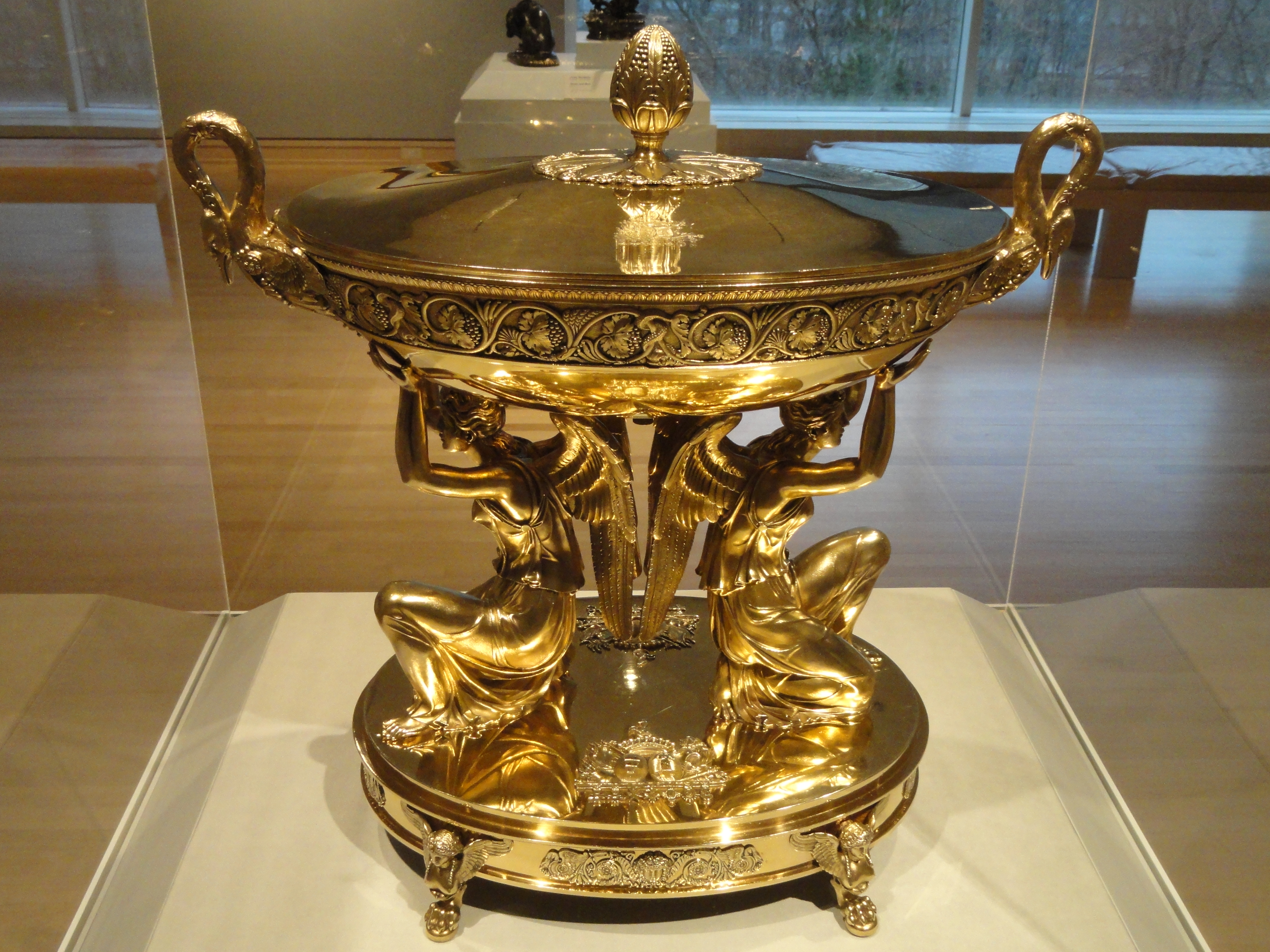
Soup tureen made in silver gilt from 1819, Indianapolis Museum of Art, Indianapolis, Indiana, USA.

Maison Odiot, in English "House of Odiot", was established in 1690, during the reign of Louis XIV by Jean-Baptiste Gaspard Odiot, considered a fine silversmith.

Emperor Napoleon Bonaparte gave Jean-Baptiste Claude, grandson of Jean-Baptiste Gaspard, many prestigious commissions for himself and his family, such as the sacred scepter and sword and the King of Rome's cradle. Immense dinner services were ordered by Pauline Borghèse, by her mother and by the Emperor himself.

Jean-Baptiste Claude was influenced by the return of the classical Greek and Egyptian motifs as expressed in the Directoire and Empire styles. Court commissions help further the reputation of Maison Odiot, and the firm provided vermeil services to courts across European.

Charles Nicolas Odiot, who excelled in the rocaille style, succeeded his father and became the purveyor by appointment to His Majesty the King Louis-Philippe and to the Royal Family of Orleans. He was later succeeded by his son Gustave who received the House of Odiot's most important commission ever, id est, 3,000 pieces of solid gold flatware for Saïd Pacha, the Viceroy of Egypt. He later became the purveyor by appointment to the court of His Imperial Majesty the Tsar. Gustave was also the last member of the Odiot family to preside over the company.

== Works ==
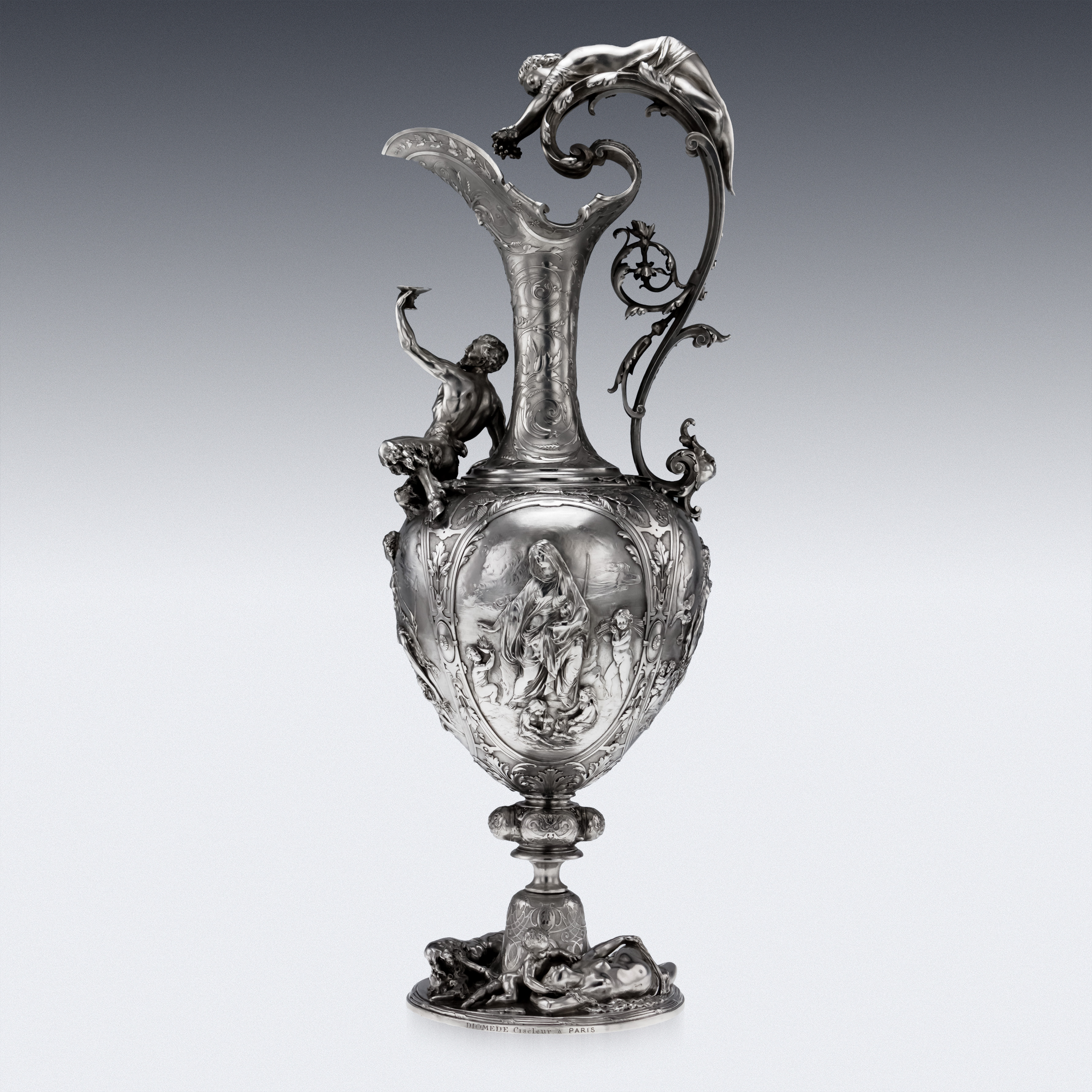
Figural Ewer by Jean-Baptiste Gustave Odiot, c.1875 at Pushkin's.

The only surviving work by him dating from before the French Revolution (1789–95) is a coffee urn (Monticello, Virginia, Jefferson Foundation) designed and commissioned by Thomas Jefferson.

In 1802 he was awarded a gold medal in the third Exposition de l’Industrie in Paris. He executed a travelling service (c. 1795–1809) for Napoleon and a large table service (1798–1809; Munich, Residenz) for Maximilian I Joseph of Bavaria (1756–1825). Odiot’s most complex work was a set of dressing-table furniture made for Empress Marie Louise in 1810 (destr. 1832).

=== Cradle of the King of Rome ===
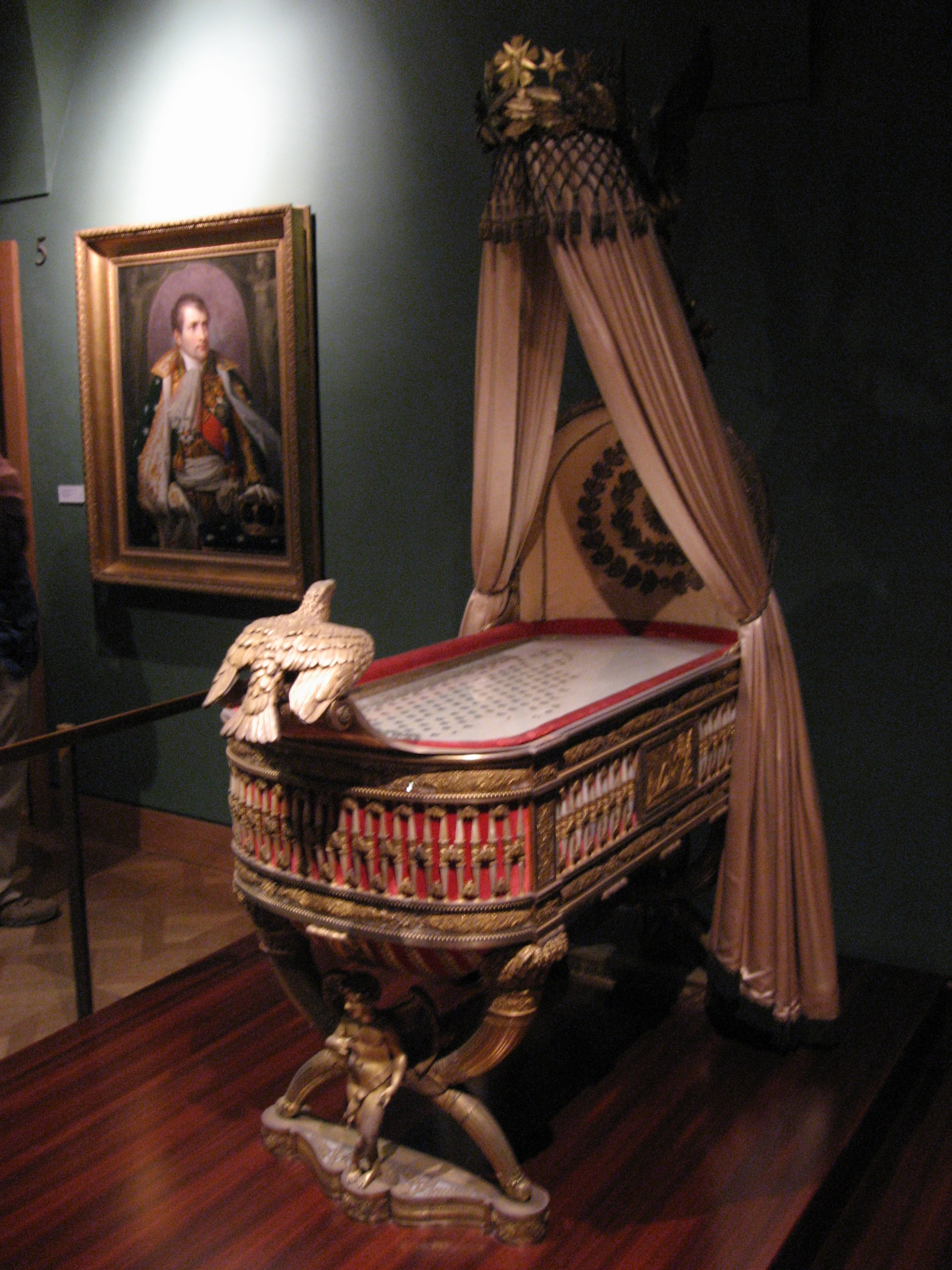
Cradle of the King of Rome, Secular and Ecclesiastical Treasury, Vienna, Austria.

Among the most prominent commissions received by Odiot, was the Cradle of the King of Rome, a wood, bronze and silver gilt cradle given as a gift by the city of Paris to Napoleon and his wife Empress Marie-Louise, on the birth of their son Napoleon II. Jean-Baptiste-Claude Odiot (1763–1850) contributed to its making along with silversmith Pierre-Philippe Thomire (1751–1843) and is signed on two of the feet: Odiot et Thomire and Thomire et Odiot. It is in the Secular and Ecclesiastical Treasury in Vienna today.
