= Charles Nicolas Odiot =

French silversmith

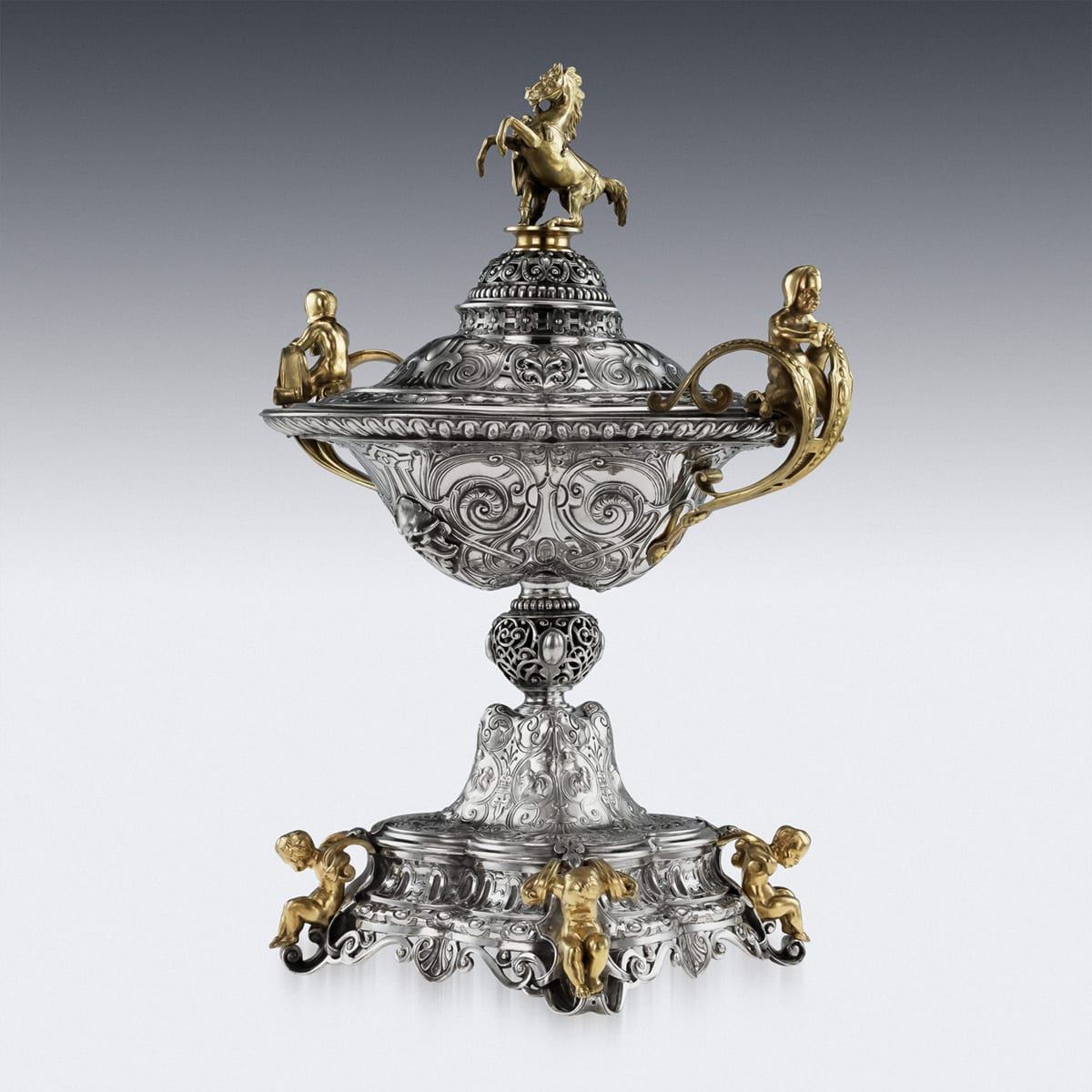
Royal Presentation Vase, Paris c.1845

Charles-Nicolas Odiot (died 1869) was the outstanding French silversmith of his generation; the son of Napoleon's silversmith, Jean-Baptiste-Claude Odiot, he inherited the direction of the extensive family workshops in 1827, as techniques of factory production were extended in the trade. He excelled in the revived Rococo style, and became the purveyor by appointment to Louis-Philippe of France and to other members of the family of Orléans.

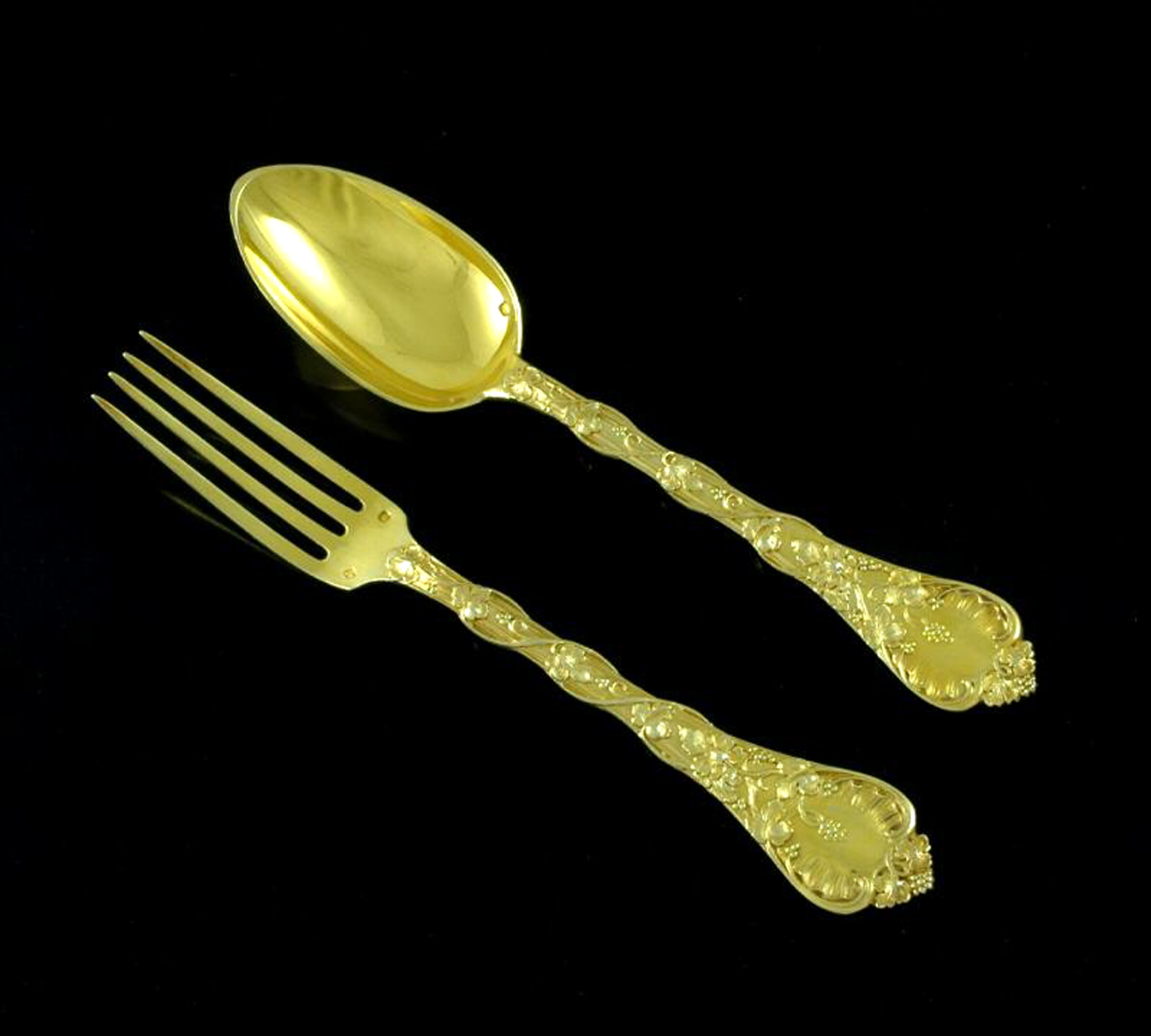
Pieces of Demidov pattern, ex-collection Sir John Antoniadis, Alexandria, Egypt (Yuko Nii Foundation)

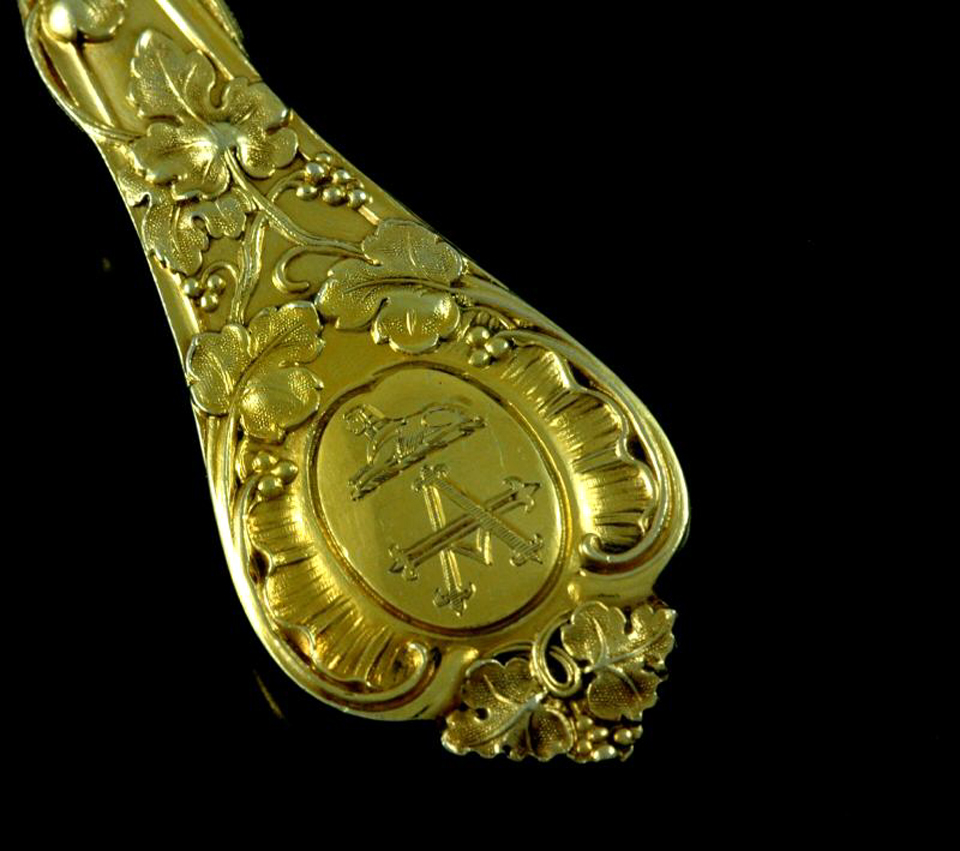
Detail

He was succeeded in turn by his son Gustave, who received the most ambitious command ever to be accepted by the House of Odiot: 3,000 pieces of solid gold tableware for Saïd Pasha, Viceroy of Egypt. He later became the purveyor by appointment to the court of the Tsar. Gustave was also the last member of the Odiot family to preside over the company, which continues in business today.

== The Odiot Demidov service ==
The Russian Imperial court, long fond of French silver, also ordered grand services from Odiot, including the monumental silver-gilt service for Count Nikolai Demidov. Delivered in 1817, it employed leading designers and sculptors, with pieces described as “small sculptures” rather than mere tableware. Valued at 130,000 francs, the service featured figures such as Nike, Fame, Bacchus and Ceres, some celebrating Napoleon's defeat, an irony given Demidoff's earlier support of the emperor. Exhibited at the Louvre in 1819, it was hailed as one of the most magnificent achievements in silversmithing.

After Demidoff's death in 1828, the service likely passed to his son Anatole.

In 1831, Maison Odiot designed the "Demidov" cutlery pattern for Prince Demidov, an excellent example of the Romantic revival of the Rococo.

Anatoly expanded the family's art collection but began selling pieces by 1863. That year it was with London silversmith and dealer Charles Frederick Hancock, who likely bought it directly from Anatole. Hancock sold it to Count Alfred de la Chapelle, an adventurer and mining magnate. Remarkably, the service survived intact through multiple owners until its 1928 sale in New York, where it was described as belonging to a “Gentleman of Title.” Its survival, and later partial reunification, stand as rare examples of both exceptional craftsmanship and the enduring legacy of one of the most opulent commissions of the Napoleonic era.
