= Niger (trotter horse) =

French trotter equine

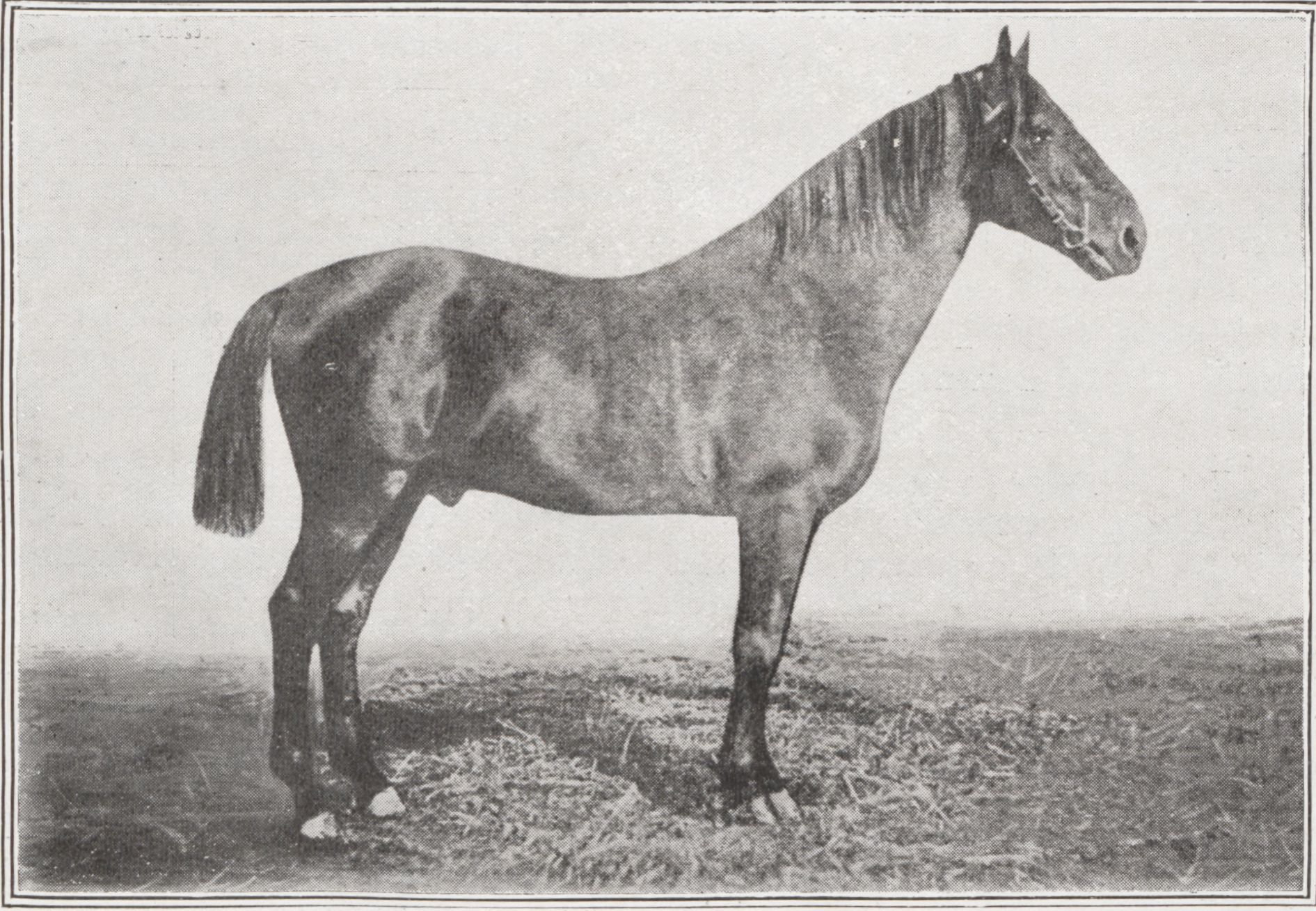
- Sire: The Norfolk Phœnomenon
- Dam: Miss Bell
- Sex: Male
- Foaled: Valencourt, Bécassine, Formosa, Finance, Hébé III, Gréviste, Fleur de mai, and Mandragore; Haras des Rouges-Terres
- Died: 1891
- Color: Black

Niger (born in 1869 at the Rouges-Terres stud farm, owned by Constant Forcinal) was a trotter horse originated from a lineage of the now-extinct Norfolk Trotter breed. A son of The Norfolk Phœnomenon, he was a grandson or great-grandson of the English stallion The Norfolk Phenomenon. His dam, Miss Bell, was a half-blood mare of English or American origin, reputed to have served Napoleon III.

Strongly influenced by the Norfolk Trotter, Niger, a small black stallion with a muscular, rounded body, is described as common-looking, with a large, bushy head. He bequeathed his brilliant gaits to his descendants, particularly at the trot, but also a hereditary respiratory ailment known as cornage. As such, although he is recognized as one of the breed leaders of the French Trotter, Niger became a controversial stallion. His male lineage disappeared at the beginning of the 20th century, but Niger remained the ancestor of the Narquois and Juvigny stallions, in the maternal lineages.

== History ==
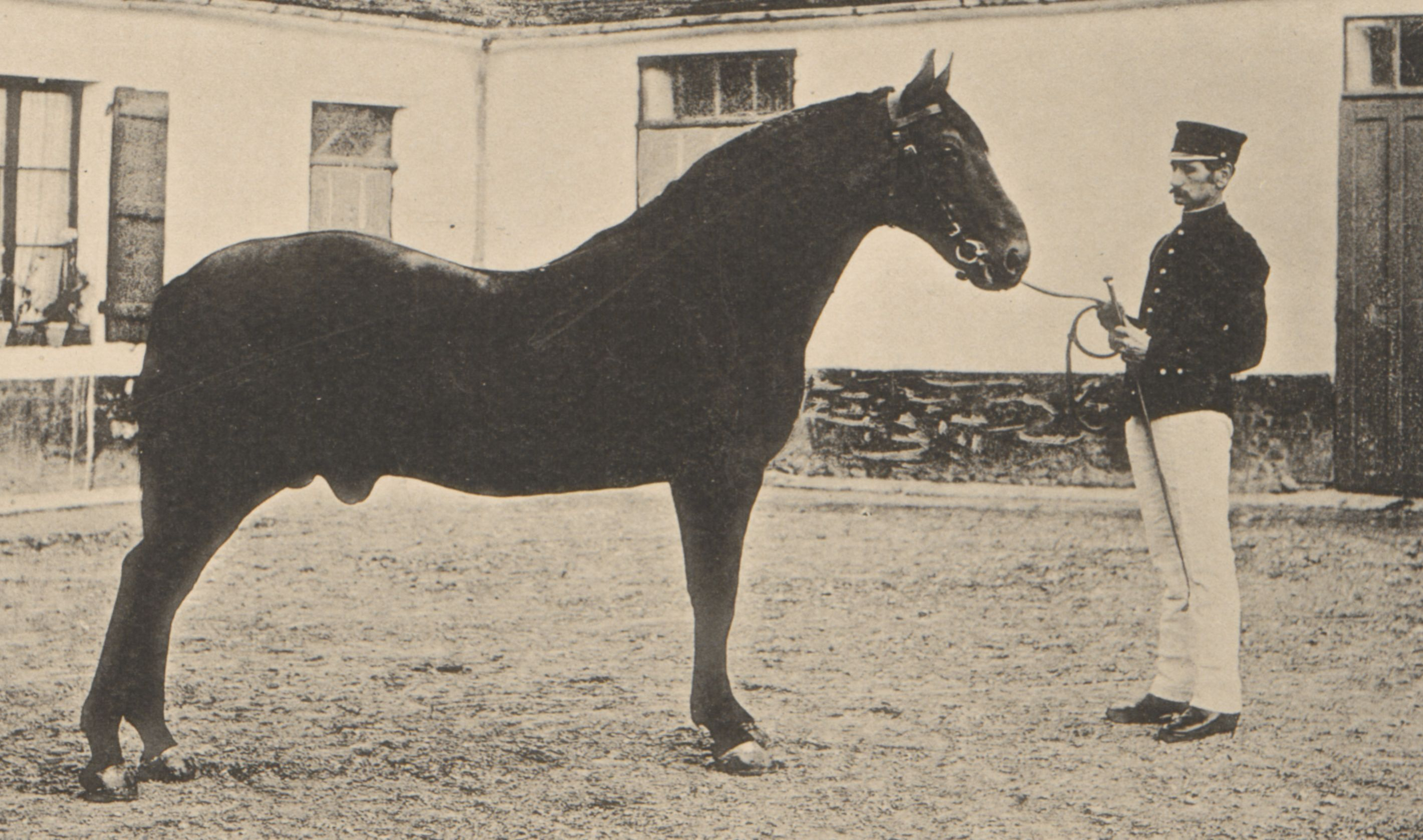
Niger, presented at the Haras national du Pin

Niger was born in 1869 at Constant Forcinal's famous Rouges-Terres stud farm in Saint-Léonard-des-Parcs, Orne. Forcinal took over the old stallion The Norfolk Phœnomenon, which the Haras Nationaux administration wanted to have slaughtered because of his great age: 22, 23 or 24. Niger is one of the stallion's last descendants. His dam, Miss Bell, of unknown origin but probably English or American, was likely also old at the time of foaling. She is said to have come from the personal stables of Napoleon III, where she was assigned to pull the imperial phaeton.

Niger was named after the color of his black coat. He began competing in mounted trotting in 1872, at the age of three, under his breeder's colors. His greatest rival was the stallion Normand. On 30 September, he finished 3rd in the first trotting stallion race at Caen, over 4,000 meters, in 7 min 22 s, behind Normand and Mont-Joie. He was beaten again by Normand on 1 October, in the Prix international over 4,000 meters, again at Caen: the race was led by Mont-Joie until 300 meters from the finish, with Niger and Normand eventually overtaking him, with Normand two seconds ahead in 7 min 5 s.

Niger took his revenge on Normand in the first race of the Haras du Pin stallion event, on 4 October, in 7 min 36 s. He was beaten by Mont-Joie in the third race on the same day, in 7 min 26 s against 7 min 3 s.

In 1873, Niger came second in the table of best speeds over 4,000 meters and more, in Caen, in 6 min 55 s.

The young stallion raced not only in Normandy but also in Toulouse and Tarbes, which meant difficult travel in the conditions of the time. He won a total of nine races, with a personal best kilometer reduction of 1 min 43 s, set over 4,000 me ters in Caen. Niger won 7,400 francs in the 1872 racing season, then 17,450 the following season.

At the end of the 1873 season, he was bought by the Haras Nationaux from Mr. Céneri Forcinal for 14,000 francs, then placed at the Haras national du Pin for the following year's breeding season. In 1878, he started breeding at Le Merlerault station. In 1885, breeder Charles Du Haÿs described him as "one of the best trotting stallions we have today".

He and his historic rival, the stallion Normand, were slaughtered at an early age for chronic horning. Paul Guillerot's book indicates an end of breeding in 1891.

== Description ==
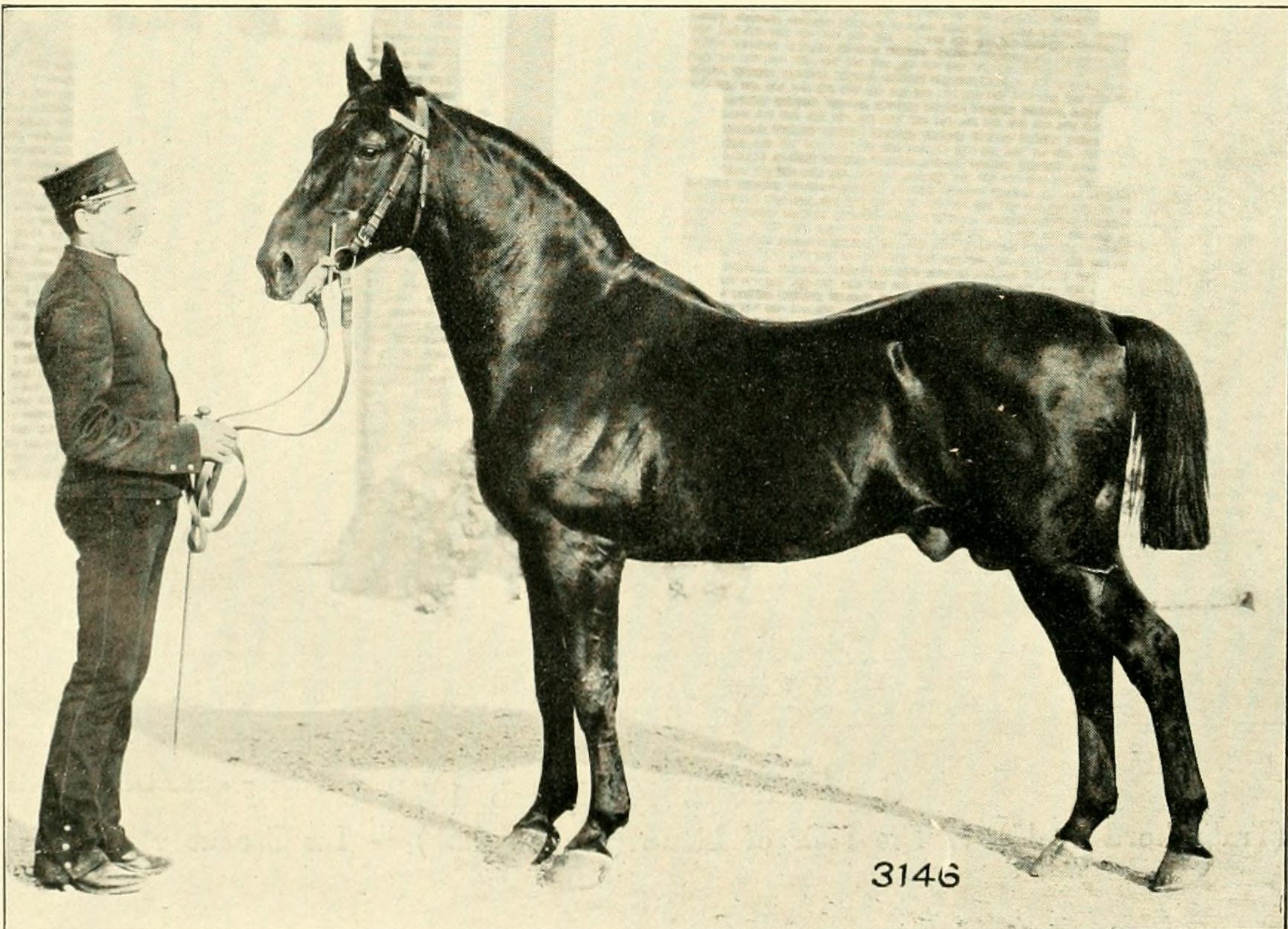
Niger, photographed by the Delton studio.

Niger was a black stallion, measuring 1.53 m according to Guillerot (1896), or 1.63 m according to Edmond Gast (1889). A "small, full-bodied horse" by design, he was much closer to his father, and therefore to the Norfolk Trotter, than to his mother, who seems to have had no influence on his appearance. Jean-Pierre Reynaldo describes him as "an ugly little black horse – hence his name – with a very common morphology", and gives credence to his height of 1.53 m. Very muscular, Niger had a common head attached to a short neck, a powerful croup, and short, lean limbs.

In his Études hippiques (1879), L. Herbin describes it as "very fast, powerful, harmonious, close to the ground, a little round and too drowned in its lines, small in stature", offering the following morphological analysis: "Long head, a little arched. Long neck, very long shoulder below the knee, hocks close to the ground. The body a little longer than the shoulder and appears too long, because the shoulder is a little forward. Slack back, but broad, muscular topline. Round rump, not quite full enough, but powerfully muscled; hips inclined at 45°, but too short".

Count Marie-Aimery de Comminges describes it as common, but "regularly conformed".

== Origins ==
Niger's origins are only partially known. His dam Miss Bell is a chestnut American or English mare recovered by the Forcinal family, reputed to be very beautiful. On the paternal side, while The Norfolk Phœnomenon, imported to France in 1851, was certainly his sire, there is controversy as to whether Niger is the grandson of The Norfolk Phœnomenon (born in 1824) or of Old Phœnomenon, son of the former.

Pedigree of Niger (1869–1891)
Sire The Norfolk Phœnomenon (1845–1872)	The Norfolk Phenomenon (1824)	The Norfolk Cob (1819)	Fireaway (1815)
Sire The Norfolk Phœnomenon (1845–1872)	The Norfolk Phenomenon (1824)	The Norfolk Cob (1819)	No info
Sire The Norfolk Phœnomenon (1845–1872)	The Norfolk Phenomenon (1824)	No info	No info
Sire The Norfolk Phœnomenon (1845–1872)	The Norfolk Phenomenon (1824)	No info	No info
Sire The Norfolk Phœnomenon (1845–1872)	No info	No info	No info
Sire The Norfolk Phœnomenon (1845–1872)	No info	No info	No info
Sire The Norfolk Phœnomenon (1845–1872)	No info	No info	No info
Sire The Norfolk Phœnomenon (1845–1872)	No info	No info	No info
Dam Miss Bell (1857)	No info	No info	No info
Dam Miss Bell (1857)	No info	No info	No info
Dam Miss Bell (1857)	No info	No info	No info
Dam Miss Bell (1857)	No info	No info	No info
Dam Miss Bell (1857)	No info	No info	No info
Dam Miss Bell (1857)	No info	No info	No info
Dam Miss Bell (1857)	No info	No info	No info
Dam Miss Bell (1857)	No info	No info	No info

== Descendance ==
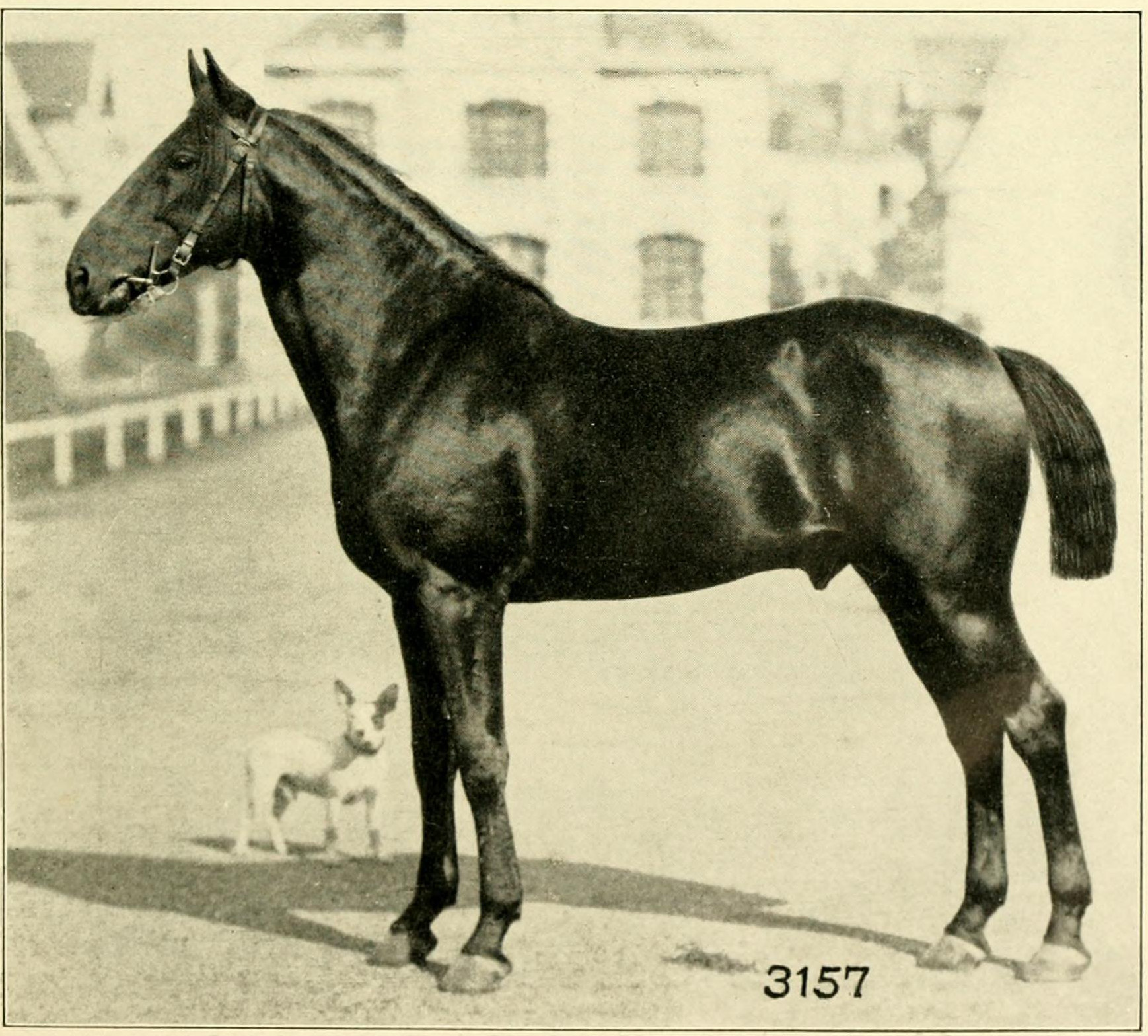
Narquois, a grandson of Niger born in 1891

Niger's descendants were numerous in the Orne department: he was the sire of 52 registered trotters, around twenty of whom become stallions in their turn, the best being Valencourt (first prize at the 1889 International Trotter Show) and Bayard IV. He sired numerous other stallions, including Acquila and Fier-à-Bras (born in 1883). Niger was among the maternal origins of the stallions Juvigny and Narquois (as well as lesser-known Novice, Mahomet and Malaga). Niger's daughters have produced good horses by crossing with the stallion Cherbourg, including Juvigny, Jolibois, and Nostradamus, and with the head stallions Fuschia (notably Mahomet, Narquois and Novice) and Phaéton. The trotting speed record has been improved by trotters out of Niger and Thoroughbred dams. Daughters of Niger are also crossed with the stallions Harley, Hippomène, Uriel, Rivoli, Serpolet-Bai, Qui-Vive!, Élan, Étendart, Écho, and Édimbourg.

Niger moved directly into second place in the list of leading trotting stallions of the national stallions (those whose foals won more than 10,000 francs in prize money) in 1879, behind Conquérant, then dropped to fourth place the following year, with his rival Normand taking the lead. He was 5th best trotting stallion in 1882, behind Conquérant, Normand, and Lavater. He was no longer included in this ranking (which now takes into account stallions whose foals have accumulated more than 25,000 francs in earnings) in subsequent years.

=== Influence on the French Trotter breed ===
Niger is at the origin of a French Trotter lineage, but his male lineage disappeared during the 20th century. In 1902, as noted by Haras Inspector General A. Ollivier, the male lineage of The Norfolk Phœnomenon was already tending to disappear. Indeed, none of Niger's sons became great trotting stallions, nor were they comparable. However, this lineage survives among the maternal strains.

In 1908, breeder Maurice de Gasté cited Niger as one of the "founders of the Normandy trotting breed". According to Albert Viel, Niger bequeathed to his descendants a compact, harmonious conformation in a close-to-earth style, with very brilliant gaits. He was also known to have passed on horning to around a third of his foals. Veterinary surgeon Paul François Charon cites a breeder who lost a lot of money with two of Niger's foals affected by cornage, one of which had to be castrated and then sold in the trade. The influence of Niger on the French Trotter was discussed at the end of the 19th century, notably by elected official and breeder Edmond Gast, who declared in 1889:

"[...] we are convinced that these sons of Phœnomenon, that Norfolk in general, have much less background than the sons of our [Norman] stallions, mentioned above, who like to fight and therefore show endurance. A Niger will sometimes leave you in the lurch, a Normand will go all the way, even if it means dying." – Edmond Gast, Le cheval normand et ses origines.

On the contrary, Édouard Nicard believes that crossing with the Norfolk Trotter has produced some of the best trotters in France, postulating that the irregularity of Niger's daughters in racing testifies to the fact that the Norfolk Trotter brought trotting ability, but not speed, which is brought by the Thoroughbred to Niger's daughters. In his opinion, Niger is the best stallion of the Norfolk lineage in France.

=== Placement in the lineage of The Norfolk Phœnomenon ===
When he drew up the pedigrees of French Trotters for his study L'élevage du trotteur en France, published in 1896, Paul Guillerot classified Niger as part of the "English family", along with other horses sired by Norfolk Trotters. In 1902, when A. Ollivier drew up his Généalogies chevalines anglo-normandes en ligne mâle, he placed Niger in the lineage of the English stallion The Norfolk Phœnomenon. According to him, the male lineage of The Norfolk Phœnomenon was then on the verge of extinction, being represented only by sons of the stallion Valencourt. According to Louis Baume, in 1913, there was "little left" of this lineage from the Norfolk Trotter, except among the maternal strains.

The Norfolk Phœnomenon's lineage
The Norkfol Phenomenon	The Norkfol Phœnomenon	Niger	Turin (1875)	
The Norkfol Phenomenon	The Norkfol Phœnomenon	Niger	Uléma (1876)	
The Norkfol Phenomenon	The Norkfol Phœnomenon	Niger	Ulysse (1876)	
The Norkfol Phenomenon	The Norkfol Phœnomenon	Niger	Un (1876)	
The Norkfol Phenomenon	The Norkfol Phœnomenon	Niger	Unité (1876)	
The Norkfol Phenomenon	The Norkfol Phœnomenon	Niger	Valencourt (1877)	Garçonnet (1884); Héliotrope (1885); Hidalgo (1885); Impartial (1886); Saint-Mélaine (1886); Jourdan (1887); Gengis-Khan (1888); Izard (1892)
The Norkfol Phenomenon	The Norkfol Phœnomenon	Niger	Acquila (1878 or 1882)	
The Norkfol Phenomenon	The Norkfol Phœnomenon	Niger	Adonias	
The Norkfol Phenomenon	The Norkfol Phœnomenon	Niger	Ajax (1883)	
The Norkfol Phenomenon	The Norkfol Phœnomenon	Niger	Fier-à-Bras (1883)	
The Norkfol Phenomenon	The Norkfol Phœnomenon	Niger	Archimède	
The Norkfol Phenomenon	The Norkfol Phœnomenon	Niger	Baptiste-le-More	
The Norkfol Phenomenon	The Norkfol Phœnomenon	Niger	Bataillon	
The Norkfol Phenomenon	The Norkfol Phœnomenon	Niger	Bayard IV	

== Bibliography ==
- Charon, Paul (1886). Étude sur le cornage chronique (in French). Asselin et Houzeau.
- Gallier, Alfred (1900). Le cheval Anglo-Normand: avec photogravures intercalées dans le texte (in French). Paris: Baillière.
- Gast, Edmond. Le cheval normand et ses origines: situation hippique de la France, étalons nationaux; Orne, Calvados, Manche, différents élevages, généalogies, portraits; courses au trot; remontes militaires; percherons... (in French). Paris.
- Guillerot, Paul (1896). L'élevage du trotteur en France: pedigrees, performances, records, productions des étalons appartenant à l'État et aux particuliers (in French). Chamuel.
- Morin, Alphonse (1871). VARIÉTÉS. LA CIVILISATION HIPPIQUE ou ÉTUDE HISTORIQUE ET PHILOSOPHIQUE sur LES MOEURS DE L'HOMME A L'ÉGARD DU CHEVAL. CHAPITRE XII (in French). Revue des haras, de l'agriculture et du commerce, Neuilly.
- Nicard, Édouard (1898). Le pur sang anglais et le trotteur français devant le transformisme (in French). Mazeron frères.
- Ollivier, O. (1902). Généalogies chevalines Anglo-Normandes en ligne male (in French). H. Rebuffé. OCLC 866897918.
- Reynaldo, Jean-Pierre (2019). Ephrem Houël: inventeur de la science hippique et créateur des premières courses au trot en France (in French). Éditions du Rocher. ISBN 978-2-268-10234-4. OCLC 1122855727.
- Reynaldo, Jean-Pierre (2015). Le trotteur français: histoire des courses au trot en France des origines à nos jours (in French). Éditions Lavauzelle et Graphic Éditions. ISBN 978-2-7025-1638-6.
- Viel, Albert (1923). Le Trotteur Français - The Norfolk Phœnomenon - Niger (in French). Paris: Le Sport universel illustré.
