= The Norfolk Phœnomenon =

Trotter horse from England

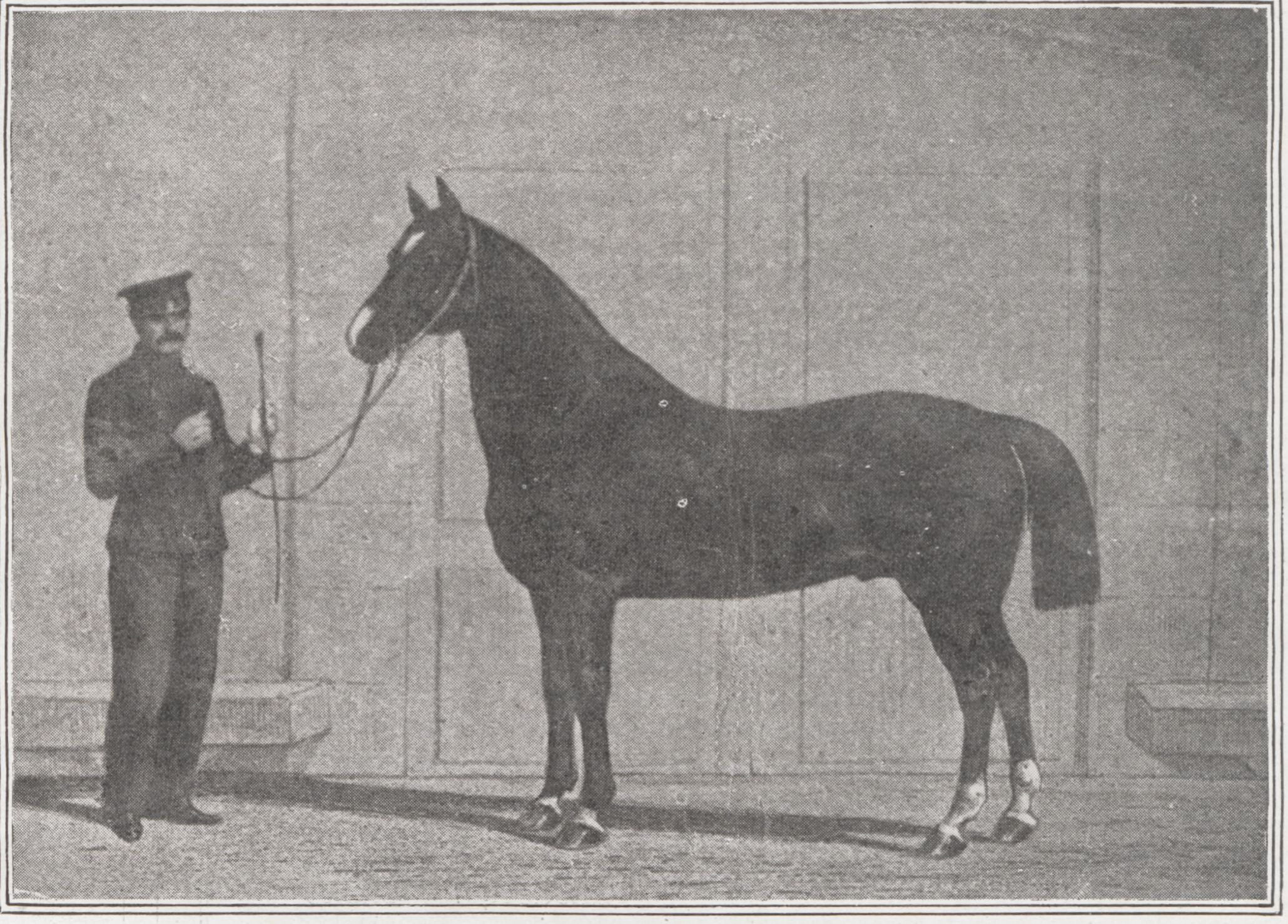
- The Norfolk Phœnomenon, based on a contemporary drawing of his time.
- Species: Horse
- Breed: Norfolk Trotter
- Sex: Male
- Born: 1845
- Died: 1872
- Parent: The Norfolk Phenomenon
- Offspring: Y., Bayadère, Ipsilanty, Niger, and Yelva
- Height: 159 cm (5 ft 3 in)

The Norfolk Phœnomenon (born in 1845 in Norfolk, England, and died in 1872 at the Rouges-Terres stud in Normandy) is a black-coated stallion of the Norfolk Trotter breed. He is a son or grandson of the most famous English trotter stallion of his time, The Norfolk Phenomenon. He was imported to France in 1851 on a mission from the Haras Nationaux.

A breeding stallion at the Haras national du Pin between 1851 and 1872, The Norfolk Phœnomenon died in 1872 at the Haras des Rouges-Terres, the Forcinal family stud. He was at the origin of a male lineage of the French Trotter breed, very successful at the end of the 19th century, but now extinct, via his son Niger. It is possible that The Norfolk Phœnomenon is the paternal grandsire of the Lavater stallion. His daughter Bayadère, however, remains his best-known direct descendant, notably for setting time and earnings records.

== Denomination and sources ==
According to Louis-Edme de Montigny (1879), the name "Phœnomenon" refers to "a Norfolk horse [...] one of those horses renowned for its performance and produce".

Paul Guillerot notes that some confusion reigns, as several English stallions were imported into France under the name "Phœnomenon" for the breeding of trotting horses, their names being preceded by an affix to differentiate them, such as "Old", "Young", "The Norfolk", etc. In practice, however, these affixes were not used. In practice, however, these affixes were not always specified in written sources, creating confusion between different horses. Guillerot believes, however, that "the main Phœnomenon" was this stallion put to stud at the Haras national du Pin.

The Norfolk Phœnomenon is also known as "The Black Norfolk Phenomenon" to distinguish it from its ancestor, who wore a strawberry roan coat.

== History ==
According to most sources, The Norfolk Phenomenon was born in England in 1845. However, M. du Häys' studbook (1864) gives a birth date of "around 1840", as does the Revue des Haras of 1882.

In 1850, the administration of the Haras Nationaux sent Mr. Perrot de Thannberg to acquire stallions in England, as part of a purchasing mission commissioned by Norman breeders. The young stallion was acquired in 1851, along with The Norfolk Champion, Turpin, Smuggler, Telegraph, Driver, Joseph Andrews, Confidence and Wildfire, and exported to France, probably at the age of 6. He is renowned for his great trotting speed, giving rise to a number of legends. Indeed, an article in the London Sunday Time claimed he could trot the 2 miles (3,218 m) in 5'4", which would give a mileage reduction of less than 1'35", a speed that Louis Baume (1913) considered unlikely at the time. The same source lends him the figure of 24 miles (38,116 m) covered in an hour, a speed that Baume considers to be totally impossible. Speed measurements at the time were complicated by the fact that no reliable chronometers were yet available.

The Norfolk Phœnomenon was bred at the Haras national du Pin, between 1851 (or 1852) and 1872. He ended his life at the Haras des Rouges-Terres, Constant Forcinal's stud at Saint-Léonard-des-Parcs in the Orne department: Forcinal had taken over the old stallion, which the Haras Nationaux administration wanted to have slaughtered on account of his advanced age. The Norfolk Phœnomenon died in 1872, having given his best son to the Forcinal stud.

== Description ==
The Norfolk Phœnomenon was a black stallion, 1.59 m tall. Jean-Pierre Reynaldo describes him as an ugly horse who "knew how to trot". Indeed, his trotting action is described (by stud inspector A. Ollivier) as "extraordinary". He also had a number of conformation faults, such as hollow knees and a poorly developed chest. In addition to the aforementioned faults, Edmond Gast also describes him as having an overly plunging back and a cornrow.

== Origins ==
The Norfolk Phœnomenon's origins are highly disputed, on both his paternal and maternal sides. Although his exact origins are obscure, he certainly counts Thoroughbreds among his ancestors.

The Norfolk Phœnomenon is either the son of The Norfolk Phenomenon (born in 1824), or of Old Phœnomenon, son of the former: English trotting stallions of the time often bore the same name from father to son. The studbook of the French stud farm administration and that of the Inspector General of Studs, Mr Eugène Hornez, record The Norfolk Phœnomenon as a son of Old Phœnomenon. The genealogical compendium of stud director M. de Cormette (1869) lists him as a son of "Norfolk Cob" and a daughter of the stallion Prétender, specifying that Godolphin Arabian and Eclipse are among his ancestors. M. du Häys' genealogical compendium lists "Norfolk Lob" and a Mecklenburger mare.

An investigation published on Bloodlines.net argues that The Norfolk Phenomenon and Old Phenomenon are only two names for the same horse, namely Mr. Bond's Norfolk Phenomenon, registered as "H522" in the Hackney studbook. The allbreedpedigreeen database lists The Norfolk Phœnomenon as a son of The Norfolk Phenomenon, born in 1824.

On the maternal side, the origins of his mother are also disputed, with some sources claiming that she was a Mecklenburger mare.

Pedigree of The Norfolk Phœnomenon
Sire The Norfolk Phenomenon	A Norfolk stallion (1819)	Fireaway – Burgess (1815)	Fireaway – Wests
Sire The Norfolk Phenomenon	A Norfolk stallion (1819)	Fireaway – Burgess (1815)	No info
Sire The Norfolk Phenomenon	A Norfolk stallion (1819)	A Shales' daughter	Marshland Shales
Sire The Norfolk Phenomenon	A Norfolk stallion (1819)	A Shales' daughter	No info
Sire The Norfolk Phenomenon	A strawberry roan mare	Fireaway – Reads (1795)	Pretender – Wroots
Sire The Norfolk Phenomenon	A strawberry roan mare	Fireaway – Reads (1795)	A trotter mare
Sire The Norfolk Phenomenon	A strawberry roan mare	No info	No info
Sire The Norfolk Phenomenon	A strawberry roan mare	No info	No info
Dam A Pretender's daughter or a Mecklenburger mare	Pretender	No info	No info
Dam A Pretender's daughter or a Mecklenburger mare	Pretender	No info	No info
Dam A Pretender's daughter or a Mecklenburger mare	Pretender	No info	No info
Dam A Pretender's daughter or a Mecklenburger mare	Pretender	No info	No info
Dam A Pretender's daughter or a Mecklenburger mare	No info	No info	No info
Dam A Pretender's daughter or a Mecklenburger mare	No info	No info	No info
Dam A Pretender's daughter or a Mecklenburger mare	No info	No info	No info
Dam A Pretender's daughter or a Mecklenburger mare	No info	No info	No info

== Descent ==
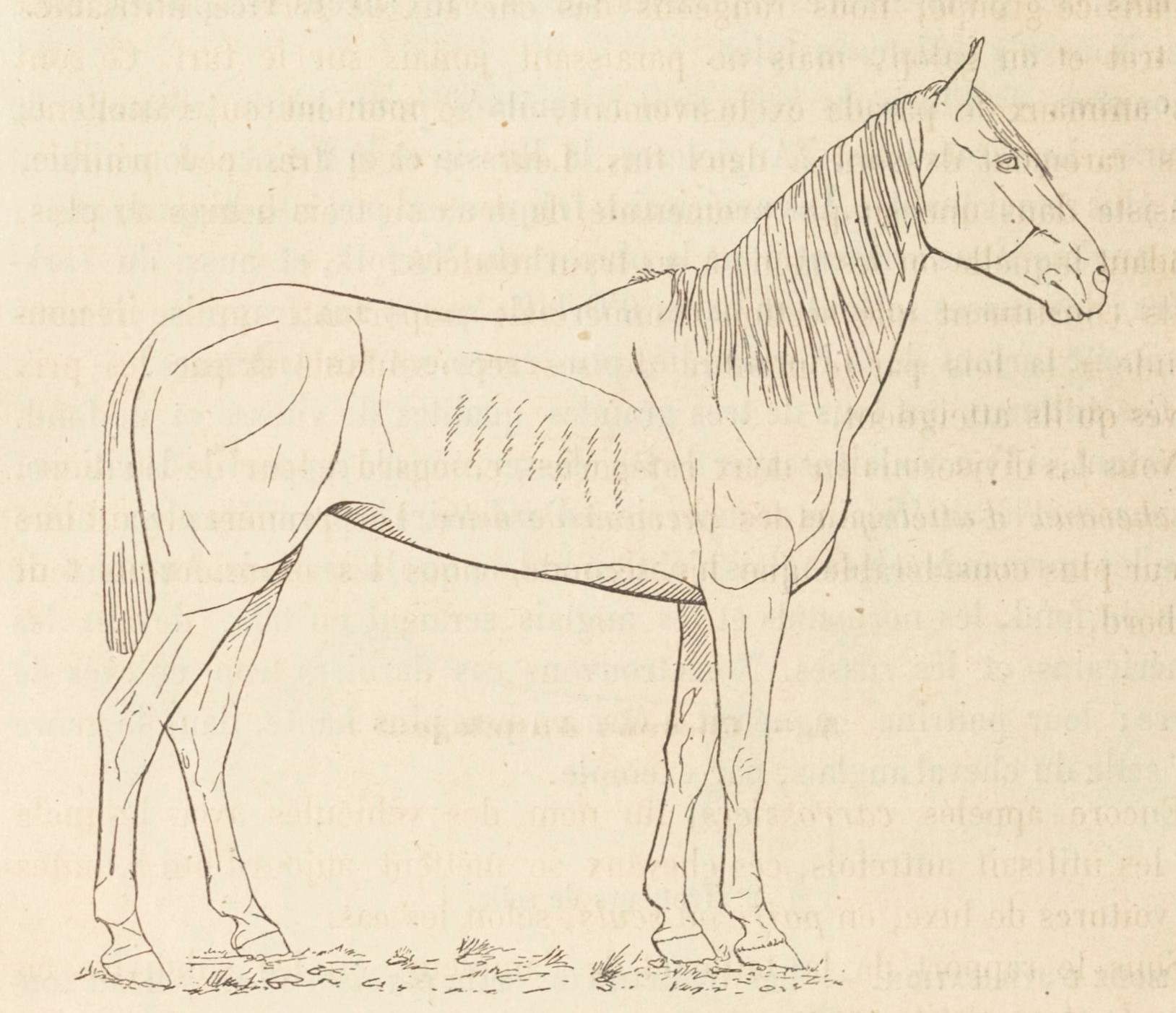
Bayadère (1859–1972), France's most famous trotting mare of the 19th century, from an engraving taken from a Delton studio photograph.

According to Commandant de Cousté, The Norfolk Phœnomenon exerts a "great influence on the Norman breed" and leaves a "deep imprint" on it. A. Ollivier adds that Phœnomenon's action has given the Anglo-Norman half-blood "brilliant, fast gaits". The Norfolk Phœnomenon is reputed to transmit "power in the hindquarters and off-the-line actions". According to Edmond Gast, however, he lacked substance, a fault he passed on to his descendants: "these sons of Phœnomenon, [...] Norfolk in general, have much less substance than the sons of our [Norman] stallions, mentioned above, who like to fight and therefore show endurance".

Of all the breeding stallions imported from England in his day, The Norfolk phœnomenon was the most successful. He sired thirty trotters, a high number at a time when trotter breeding in France was in its infancy. He is considered the horse with the greatest influence on half-blood trotters in the 1850s. On the male foal side, he sired the stallion Y. (1858, dam Henriette, by Invisible), Fidèle au malheur (1861), Hannon (1863), Ipsilanty (1864), Jacques Mai, Marignan (1868), Niger (1869, dam Miss Bell), and Noirmont (born in 1869, breeding stallion in Normandy between 1873 and 1886).

One of his daughters, Bayadère, became the most famous French Trotter of the 19th century, lowering the trotting mile record to 1'42". His other daughters include the mares Yelva, Baronne, Brunette, Candelaria, Crinoline, Espérance I, Espérance II, Fortunée, Fille de Coeur, Gazelle, Mascotte, Othelina, Sans Façon and Vilna (dam of Écho).

There is some controversy as to whether Lavater is his grandson, as some sources describe him as a son of Y., while others attribute the half-blood Crocus as his sire.

In any case, the influence of The Norfolk Phœnomenon spread mainly via Niger's daughters, who according to Edmond Gast, did well in crossbreeding with the stallions Cherbourg and Fuschia. A. Ollivier believes that the most successful crosses were between Thoroughbred dams and The Norfolk Phœnomenon strain.

The Norfolk Phœnomenon (1845–1872)	Y. (1858)	Lavater (1867–1887)
The Norfolk Phœnomenon (1845–1872)	Y. (1858)	Vilna (1871)
The Norfolk Phœnomenon (1845–1872)	Bayadère (1859–1872)	Roquelaure (1869)
The Norfolk Phœnomenon (1845–1872)	Bayadère (1859–1872)	Galathée (1870)
The Norfolk Phœnomenon (1845–1872)	Bayadère (1859–1872)	Orpheline (1871)
The Norfolk Phœnomenon (1845–1872)	Ipsilanty (1864)	
The Norfolk Phœnomenon (1845–1872)	Niger (1869–1891)	Valencourt (1877)
The Norfolk Phœnomenon (1845–1872)	Niger (1869–1891)	Bécassine (1879)
The Norfolk Phœnomenon (1845–1872)	Niger (1869–1891)	Formosa (1880)
The Norfolk Phœnomenon (1845–1872)	Niger (1869–1891)	Finance (1883)
The Norfolk Phœnomenon (1845–1872)	Niger (1869–1891)	Hébé III (1885)
The Norfolk Phœnomenon (1845–1872)	Niger (1869–1891)	Gréviste (1886)
The Norfolk Phœnomenon (1845–1872)	Niger (1869–1891)	Fleur de mai
The Norfolk Phœnomenon (1845–1872)	Niger (1869–1891)	Mandragore
The Norfolk Phœnomenon (1845–1872)	Yelva	Kilomètre (1866)

=== The Norfolk Phœnomenon lineage ===
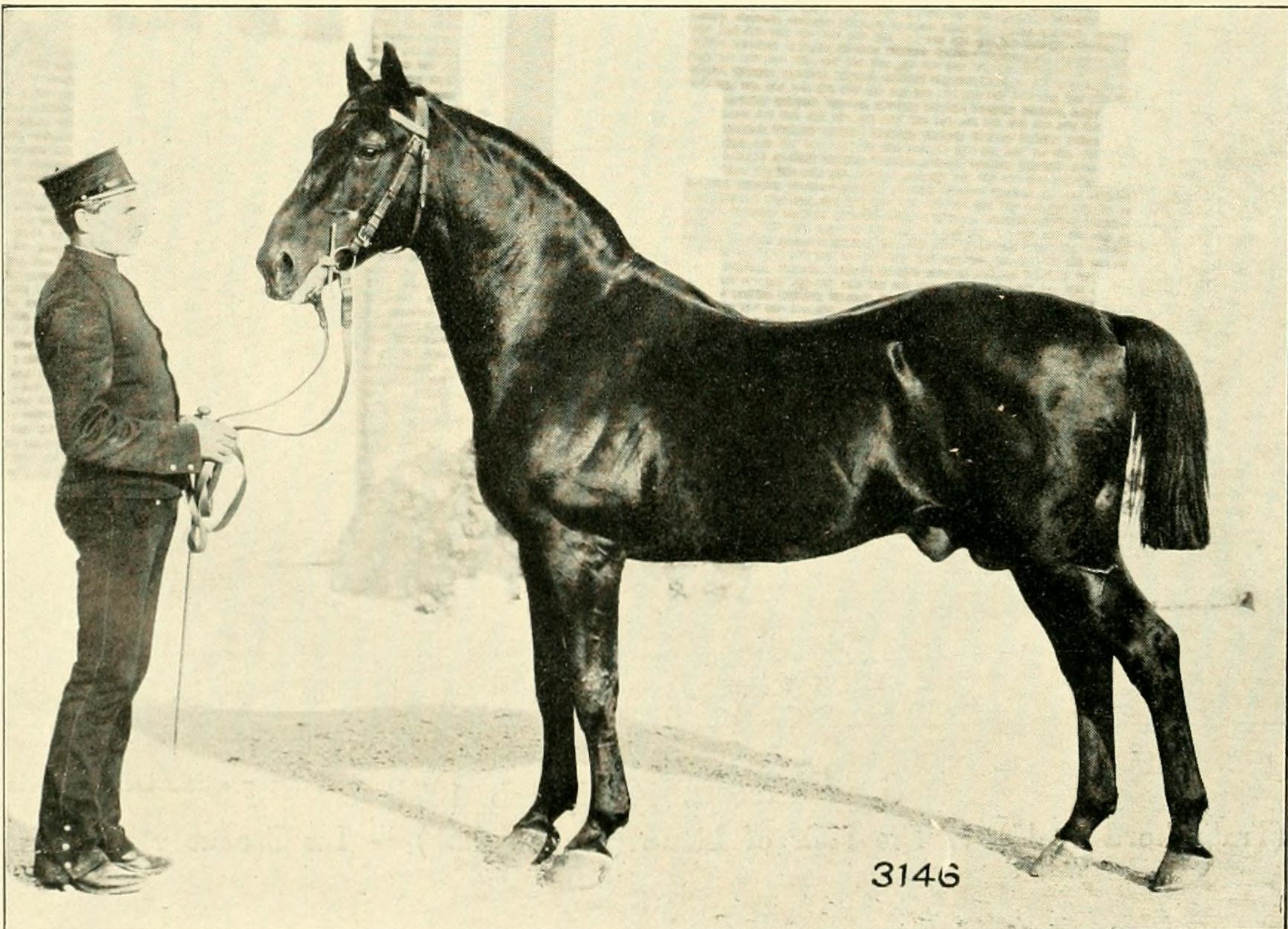
Niger (photographed by the Delton studio), the most famous son of The Norfolk Phœnomenon, propagator of his male line.

When Edmond Gast listed the great trotter families in 1889, he attributed one of them to the "head of the family" The Norfolk Phœnomenon. Major Henri Cousté did the same in his Stud-book normand: les étalons de demi-sang rangés par familles, in 1897. Édouard Nicard, on the other hand, includes him in a "Norfolk family", which also includes the stallion Lavater. For Caen veterinarian Alfred Gallier, The Norfolk Phœnomenon is the first of the remarkable Anglo-Norman trotting stallions, in order of birth.

His son Niger is the most influential. Through Niger, The Norfolk Phœnomenon started a French Trotter lineage, but this paternal lineage disappeared during the 20th century. By 1901, this male lineage had already disappeared from racetrack trotters, and A. Ollivier considers it to be "on the brink of extinction".

The Norfolk Phœnomenon, on the other hand, survives in the maternal lines, appearing in the origins of Juvigny and Narquois.

The Norfolk Phenomenon (1824)	Old Phœnomenon	The Norfolk Phœnomenon (1845)	Y. (1858)	Lavater (1867)	Tigris (1867)
The Norfolk Phenomenon (1824)	Old Phœnomenon	The Norfolk Phœnomenon (1845)	Y. (1858)	Lavater (1867)	Etendard
The Norfolk Phenomenon (1824)	Old Phœnomenon	The Norfolk Phœnomenon (1845)	Ipsilanty (1864)	Noville	
The Norfolk Phenomenon (1824)	Old Phœnomenon	The Norfolk Phœnomenon (1845)	Marignan (1868)		
The Norfolk Phenomenon (1824)	Old Phœnomenon	The Norfolk Phœnomenon (1845)	Niger (1869)	Valencourt (1877)	Jourdan
The Norfolk Phenomenon (1824)	Old Phœnomenon	The Norfolk Phœnomenon (1845)	Niger (1869)	Fier à bras (1883)	

== Bibliography ==
- Baume, Louis (1913). Influence des courses au trot sur la production chevaline en France [The influence of trotting on horse production in France] (in French).
- Cousté, Henri. Stud-book normand : les étalons de demi-sang rangés par familles [Normandy Studbook: half-bred stallions sorted by family] (in French).
- Gast, Edmond. Le cheval normand et ses origines : situation hippique de la France, étalons nationaux; Orne, Calvados, Manche, différents élevages, généalogies, portraits; courses au trot; remontes militaires; percherons… [The Normandy horse and its origins: France's equestrian situation, national stallions; Orne, Calvados, Manche, different breedings, genealogies, portraits; trotting races; military remounts; percherons...] (in French). Paris.
- Guillerot, Paul. L'élevage du trotteur en France : pedigrees, performances, records, productions des étalons appartenant à l'État et aux particuliers [Trotter breeding in France: pedigrees, performances, records, production of state-owned and privately-owned stallions] (in French). Paris: Chamuel.
- Morin, M. A. Revue des haras, de l'agriculture et du commerce [Review of stud farms, agriculture and trade] (in French).
- Nicard, Édouard. Le pur sang anglais et le trotteur français devant le transformisme [English thoroughbreds and French trotters in the face of transformism] (in French). Mazeron frères.
- Ollivier, A. (1902). Généalogies chevalines Anglo-Normandes en ligne male [Anglo-Norman horse genealogies online male] (in French). H. Rebuffé.
- Reynaldo, Jean-Pierre (2019). Éphrem Houël : inventeur de la science hippique et créateur des premières courses au trot en France [Éphrem Houël: inventor of horse science and creator of the first trotting races in France] (in French). Éditions du Rocher. ISBN 978-2-268-10234-4.
- Reynaldo, Jean-Pierre (2015). Le trotteur français : histoire des courses au trot en France des origines à nos jours [The French trotter: the history of trotting in France from its origins to the present day] (in French). Éditions Lavauzelle et Graphic Éditions. p. 428. ISBN 978-2-7025-1638-6.
- Viel, Albert (1923). Le Trotteur Français – The Norfolk Phœnomenon – Niger [Le Trotteur Français – The Norfolk Phœnomenon – Niger] (in French). Paris: Le Sport universel illustré.
