= Bayadère (mare) =

French trotting race mare

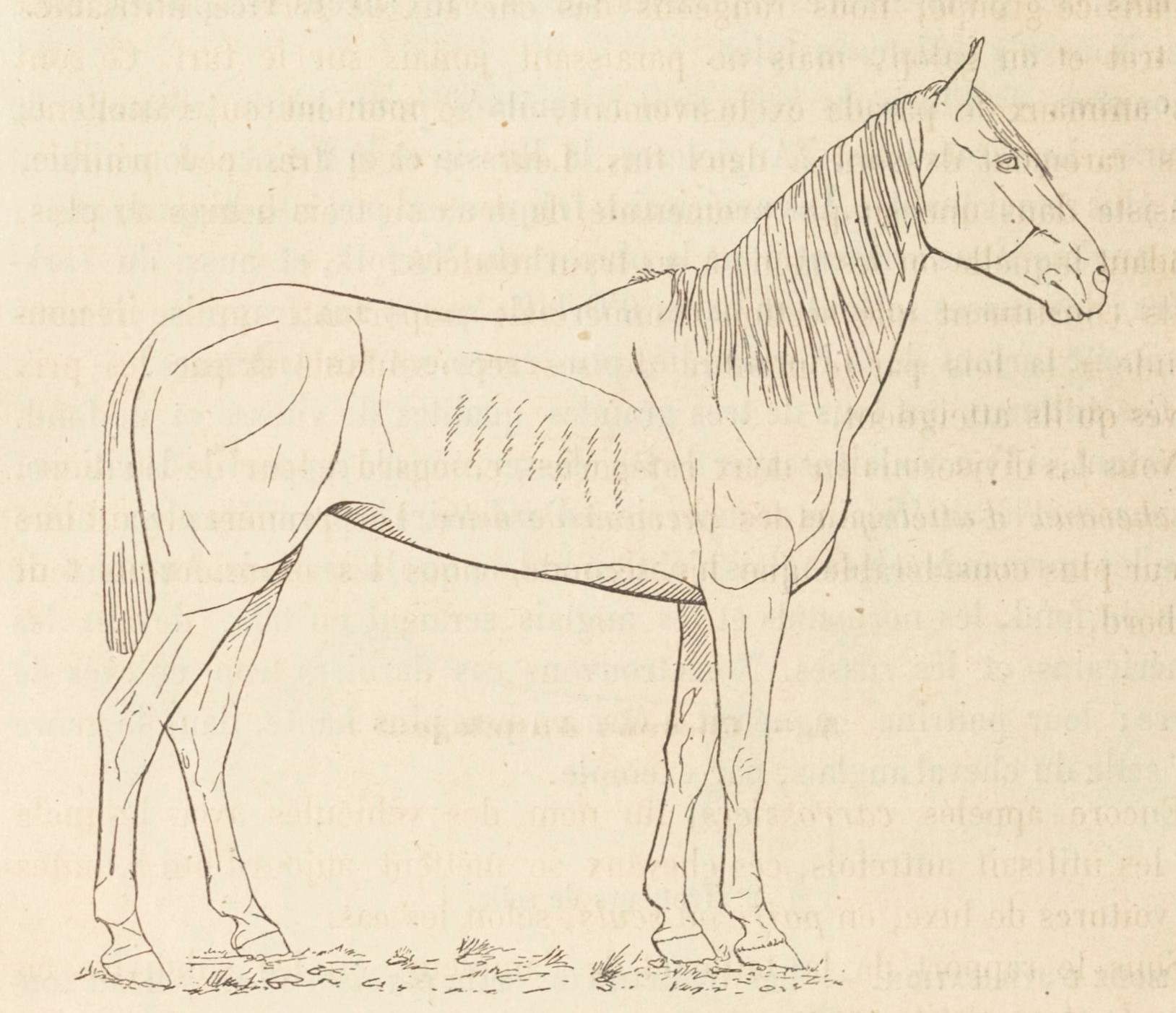
- Sire: The Norfolk Phœnomenon
- Dam: Bayadère
- Sex: Female
- Foaled: Roquelaure, Galathée, and Orpheline; Tournai-sur-Dive
- Died: 1872
- Color: Bay

Bayadère (1859–1872) was France's most famous trotting mare of the 19th century. The daughter of The Norfolk Phœnomenon and a mare also named Bayadère, she lost her mother at birth, then was bred and trained for trotting by her owners, Mr. Lefèvre-Montfort and Mr. Tiercelin.

Accumulating earnings were considered prodigious for her time; she was beaten only once or twice in trotting races. She has the distinction of having first competed in mounted trotting races, then in steeplechase racing, though with less success. Bayadère became a broodmare after her racing career. Known for her playful temperament and tendency to jump over obstacles in her path, she died at the age of 13 after impaling herself on her pasture fence.

== Sources ==
Bayadère's contemporary sources are mainly compiled by hippologist and stud farm inspector Charles Du Haÿs (1818–1898), notably in his 1864 work Les trotteurs, origines, performances et produits. Horse historian Jean-Pierre Reynaldo devotes a section to Bayadère in his reference work Le Trotteur français (2007).

== History ==
Bayadère was born in 1859 at Mr Tiercelin's stables in Tournai-sur-Dive, Orne, Normandy. Her dam, also named Bayadère, died giving birth to her. The filly was bred in Pont-l'Évêque, then trained in Orne by her owners, Mr. Lefèvre-Montfort and Mr. Tiercelin.

Sources differ as to the number of races won and earnings of Bayadère. According to journalist Louis Cauchois (1912) and Jean-Pierre Reynaldo (2007 and 2015), Bayadère's total trotting winnings exceeded 50,000 francs, a sum considered "prodigious" at the time. In his 1908 book Le cheval de demi-sang, races françaises, Alfred Gallier cites 41 races won for 53,700 francs in earnings. In 1865, owner-breeder Alexandre Gaume, a contemporary of Bayadère, reported 32 victories in 33 races.

Armand Goubaux and Gustave Barrier's De l'extérieur du cheval (1884, translated into English in 1892 as The exterior of the Horse) mentions 22 victories for the years 1862 and 1863, as does journalist Albert de Saint-Albin, who reports earnings of 27,000 francs for Bayadère in those two years, in his 1890 book Les courses de chevaux en France. According to Reynaldo, in three years of competition, Bayadère won twenty-one trotting races throughout France.

Two defeats are mentioned in Fernand Laffon's Le monde des courses (1896).

=== Trotting career ===
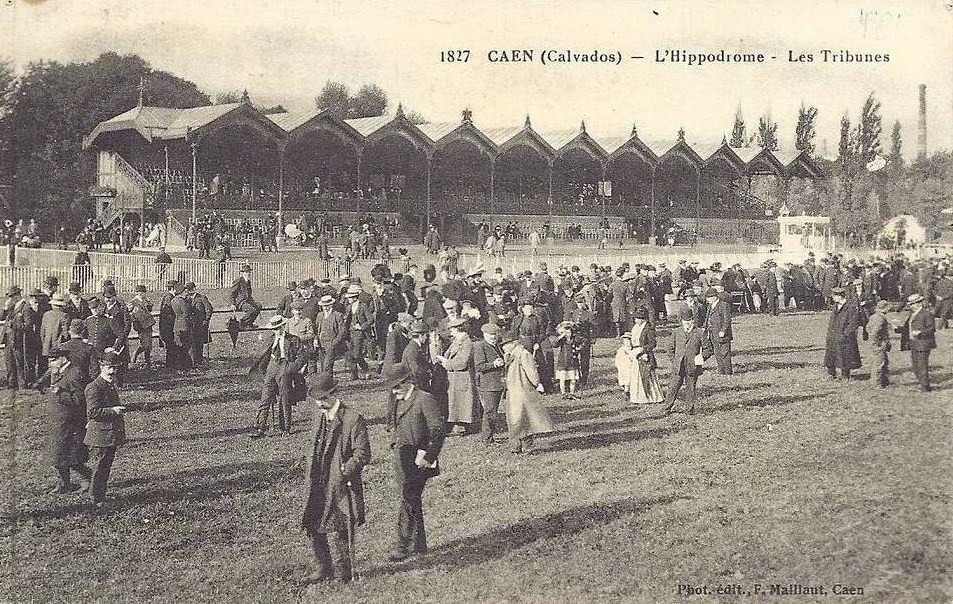
The Caen racecourse (here circa 1900–1910), where Bayadère first ran

According to Reynaldo, Bayadère contested her first trotting race over a distance of 4,000 m on 29 July 1862, at Caen, which she won with a kilometer reduction of 1'46, excellent for a mare of her age. At the same meet, she took part in another race, over 5,000 m, and beat Yelva, a 4-year-old mare considered the best of her time. With these two victories on the same day, Bayadère earned her owners 2,000 francs twice over. She went on a competition tour, racing at Le Pin-au-Haras, Falaise and Avranches. There, she beats her speed record, with a kilometer reduction of 1'45''.

She remains unbeaten in her first 20 races, ridden by jockey Ludovic Bellet. According to Charles Du Haÿs, her earnings in 1863 alone amounted to 19,000 francs. Bayadère repeated the feat of winning two races on the same day. In 1864, according to Charles Du Haÿs for the magazine La vie à la campagne, she won 10 of 11 races (still ridden by Bellet), with earnings of 14,700 francs.

Bayadère was beaten once, by Électeur, at Caen on 2 August 1864 (other sources incorrectly describe her as "unbeaten"). However, she weighed 68 kg, and Électeur 65 kg. This defeat caused quite a stir. Bayadère usually finished her races several hundred meters ahead of her rivals. On 15 August 1864, in Deauville, she easily beat her three rivals over 4,000m.

She raced not only in Normandy, but also at racecourses in the north and south of France. She set her speed record at 1'42. Her average time over 4,000 m was 7' to 7'15. According to Alexandre Gaume, she carried up to 96 kg in mounted trotting.

=== Steeplechase career ===
Faced with a lack of trotting competition, her owner M. Lefèvre-Montfort trained her in steeplechase racing in 1867. However, Bayadère was not as talented in the sport as in mounted trotting:

"Why should this heroic trotter, excluded by her victories from all trotting struggles, be condemned to leave her marvelous specialty to chase the fortunes of steeplechases, where she brings the same heart, but not the same superiority?" —Louis d'Osseville, De l'influence du cheval de demi-sang anglo-normand sur l'amélioration générale

An anecdote from one of the steeplechase races, at Caen in 1866, is recounted: Bayadère missed crossing the bench, fell and her rider, the young Lavignée, was thrown off; the mare continued her race without a rider. She then jumped the ropes and entered the trotting track, where she completed two laps (4,000 meters) at racing trot, to the enthusiastic cheers of spectators shouting "Bravo! Bayadère at the trot!

Bayadère won two races during her steeplechase career.

=== Broodmare ===
In 1868, Bayadère became a broodmare, giving birth to a foal or filly by Conquérant each year in 1869 (Roquelaure), 1870 (Galathée) and 1871 (Orpheline). The mare died in 1872 during her fourth gestation when she impaled herself on a fence she tried to climb over. The magazine Sport universel illustré incriminates her obstacle course training as the cause of her death, as Bayadère was in the habit of attempting to jump fences in her pasture. Jean-Pierre Reynaldo, on the other hand, points to the mare's playful nature.

== Description ==
Bayadère was a bay or bay-brown mare. According to Charles Du Haÿs, her size is "barely approaching average". She is reputed to have had perfect tendons, joints and breathing.

According to Charles Tiercelin, son of one of Bayadère's two owners, she was rarely confined to the stall, the door remaining open to allow her to roam freely in the farmyard. Her stall companion was a cat, and she only agreed to stay in the box if the cat was with her.

According to Charles Tiercelin, the mare's character was said to be very gentle, although she was alert and lively. She was playful, and enjoyed jumping over roadside embankments when out for a walk. She appreciated being petted, and Charles Tiercelin, as a child, testified that he used to enjoy riding Bayadère by leaning on her head to scratch her back.

Bayadère is one of the rare examples of racehorses that competed at both trot and gallop.

== Origins ==
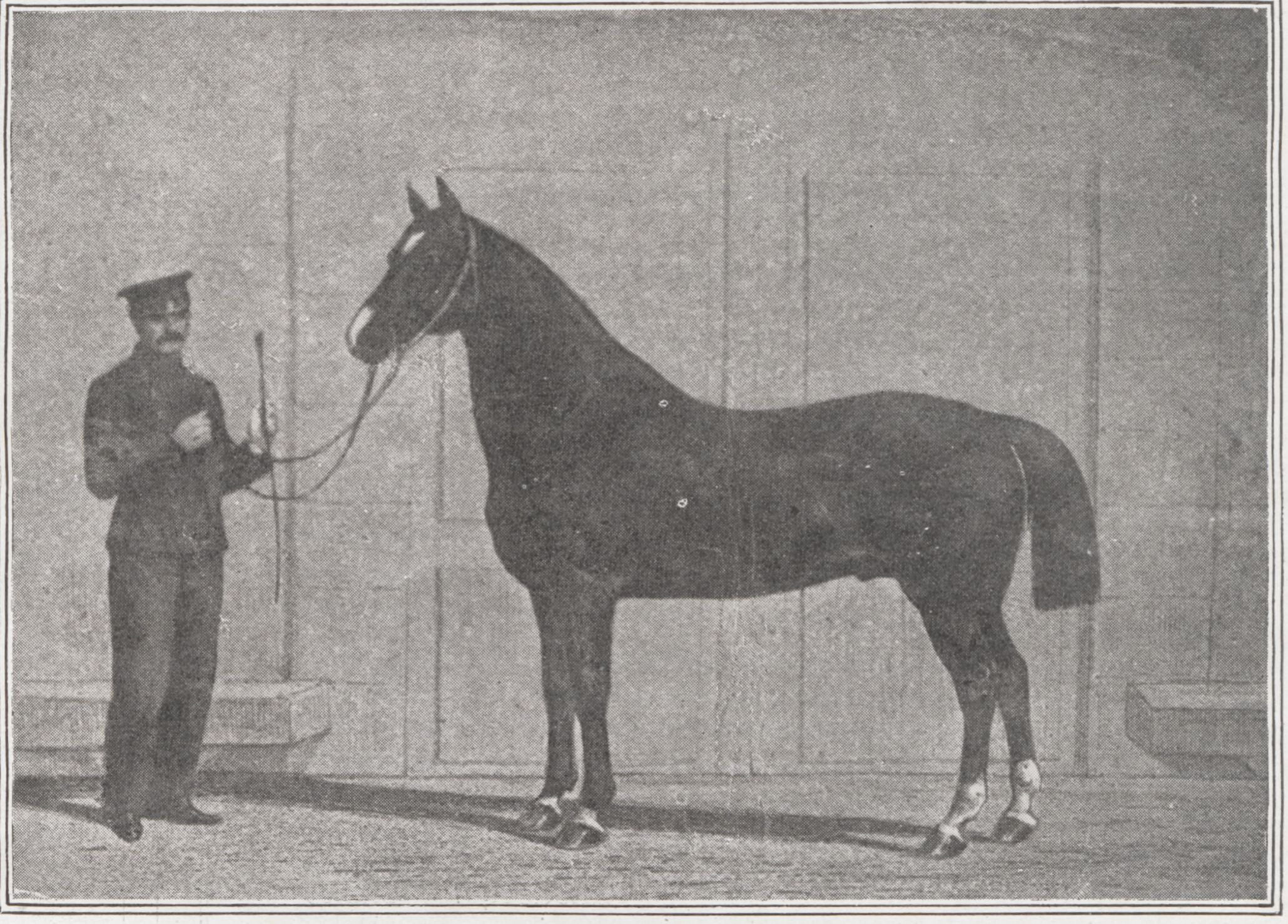
The Norfolk Phœnomenon, sire of Bayadère

Bayadère is a daughter of The Norfolk Phœnomenon who had sired other trotting horses including Électeur and Yelva.

Bayadère's dam (who was also named Bayadère) ran in trotting races, and had been blinded in one eye by a whip. She died after giving birth to Bayadère, her only offspring.

Bayadère-mère's sire is a Thoroughbred named Ramsay, and her dam is a Norfolk Trotter mare named Marquise, born around 1835. According to Albert de Saint-Albin, Marquise was one of England's finest trotting mares. She is presumed to be a daughter of Old Phenomenon (also known as The Norfolk Phenomenon). Apart from Bayadère, Marquise had three other offspring in France: Ouvrier, Talma and Fridoline. The thoroughbred Ramsay was a racehorse unbeaten in four races.

Bayadère's origins are mainly marked by the Norfolk Trotter, which accounts for three-quarters of her pedigree. Her other origins are Thoroughbred.

Pedigree of Bayadère (1859–1872)
Sire The Norfolk Phœnomenon (1845–1872)	The Norfolk Phenomenon (1824)	The Norfolk Cob (1819)	Fireaway (1815)
Sire The Norfolk Phœnomenon (1845–1872)	The Norfolk Phenomenon (1824)	The Norfolk Cob (1819)	No info
Sire The Norfolk Phœnomenon (1845–1872)	The Norfolk Phenomenon (1824)	No info	No info
Sire The Norfolk Phœnomenon (1845–1872)	The Norfolk Phenomenon (1824)	No info	No info
Sire The Norfolk Phœnomenon (1845–1872)	No info	No info	No info
Sire The Norfolk Phœnomenon (1845–1872)	No info	No info	No info
Sire The Norfolk Phœnomenon (1845–1872)	No info	No info	No info
Sire The Norfolk Phœnomenon (1845–1872)	No info	No info	No info
Dam Bayadère (1854–1859)	Ramsay (1845)	Sylvio (1826–1854)	No info
Dam Bayadère (1854–1859)	Ramsay (1845)	Sylvio (1826–1854)	No info
Dam Bayadère (1854–1859)	Ramsay (1845)	Emelina	No info
Dam Bayadère (1854–1859)	Ramsay (1845)	Emelina	No info
Dam Bayadère (1854–1859)	Marquise (1835)	The Norfolk Phenomenon (1824)	The Norfolk Cob (1819)
Dam Bayadère (1854–1859)	Marquise (1835)	The Norfolk Phenomenon (1824)	No info
Dam Bayadère (1854–1859)	Marquise (1835)	No info	No info
Dam Bayadère (1854–1859)	Marquise (1835)	No info	No info

== Descendants ==
Although Bayadère's colt and two fillies all raced and performed well, none had the qualities of their dam. As Mr Tiercelin died in 1870, Bayadère's offspring ran under the sole name of Mr Lefèvre-Montfort. Roquelaure achieves a kilometer reduction of 1'50, Galathée 1'49, and Orpheline 1'53. Galathée races, among others, in 1873.

Bayadère
Roquelaure (1869)	Galathée (1870)	Orpheline (1871)

Bayadère's two fillies were bred but none of their descendants achieved a kilometer reduction of less than 1'37. By 1917, Galathée's descendants appeared to be extinct in the trotter lines. On the other hand, Orpheline's descendants were maintained that same year by Madame Edeline, the only breeder at the time to own descendants of Bayadère, who trotted at around 1'40".

== Recognition and tributes ==
Commenting on Bayadère's performance in 1863, Charles Du Haÿs declared that France had succeeded in establishing a national trotting breed through its dams. Stud inspector Éphrem Houël cited Bayadère as one of the trotters capable of competing with the best English and Russian horses of her day.

Horse historian Jean-Pierre Reynaldo calls her the "first star of French trotting" and France's most famous trotting mare in the 19th century, at a time when horses' careers were short and the media almost non-existent. She was named after the Prix Bayadère, a trial prize for fillies.

== Bibliography ==
- Cauchois, Louis (1917). Une héroïne du trotting français : Bayadère (in French). La France chevaline : journal des intérêts hippiques, haras, remonte militaire, concours, courses, foires : moniteur officiel des courses au trot.
- Du Haÿs, Charles (1864). Les trotteurs : origines, performances et produits des individualités, qui ont le plus marqué dans les courses au trot (in French). CH Tanera et Ve Parent & fils.
- Reynaldo, Jean-Pierre (2015). Le trotteur français : Histoire des courses au trot en France des origines à nos jours (in French). Éditions Lavauzelle. ISBN 978-2-7025-1638-6.
- Sport universel illustré (1912). Une trotteuse-galopeuse il y a 50 ans (in French). France: La Vie au grand air. pp. 16 May 2021.
