= Fuschia (trotter horse) =

French trotter equine

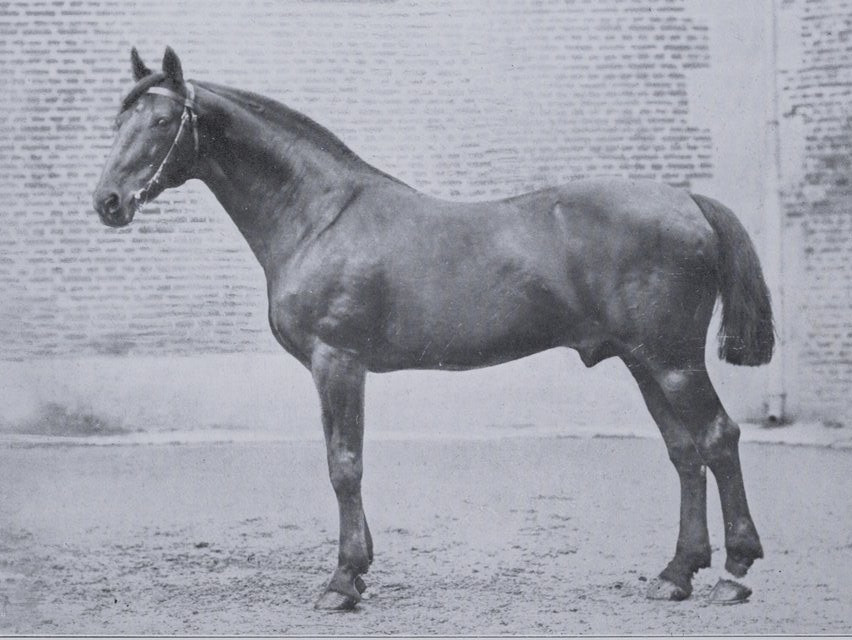
- Sire: Reynolds
- Dam: Rêveuse
- Sex: Male
- Foaled: Narquois, Nitouche, Océanie, Quartier-Maître, Réséda, Trinqueur, Travailleur, Alérion, Bémécourt, Bégonia, and Byzance; Saint-Côme-du-Mont
- Died: 1908; Haras National du Pin
- Color: Bay
- Owner: Jean Gosselin

Fuschia (1883 – August 1908) was a trotter horse born in the Manche region of France, and head of the French Trotter breed. Winner of 17 of the 20 races in which he competed in mounted trotting from age 3 to age 5, he is best known for having been an excellent sire at the Le Pin national stud, to the point of imposing for the first time a lottery system for the allocation of breeding rights to brood mares.

Although an excellent competitor and sire, Fuschia, a tall bay stallion, was criticized by some stud officers for his ugly appearance, in particular the shape of his head and the bottom of his limbs, a "common" appearance that he passed on to his foals.

Considered the most illustrious trotting stallion of his time, this grandson of Conquérant became in turn the sire of 390 trotters, 115 of whom were approved as breeding stallions in the French Trotter studbook, spreading his lineage. He is one of the six remaining branches of Conquérant's lineage.

== History ==
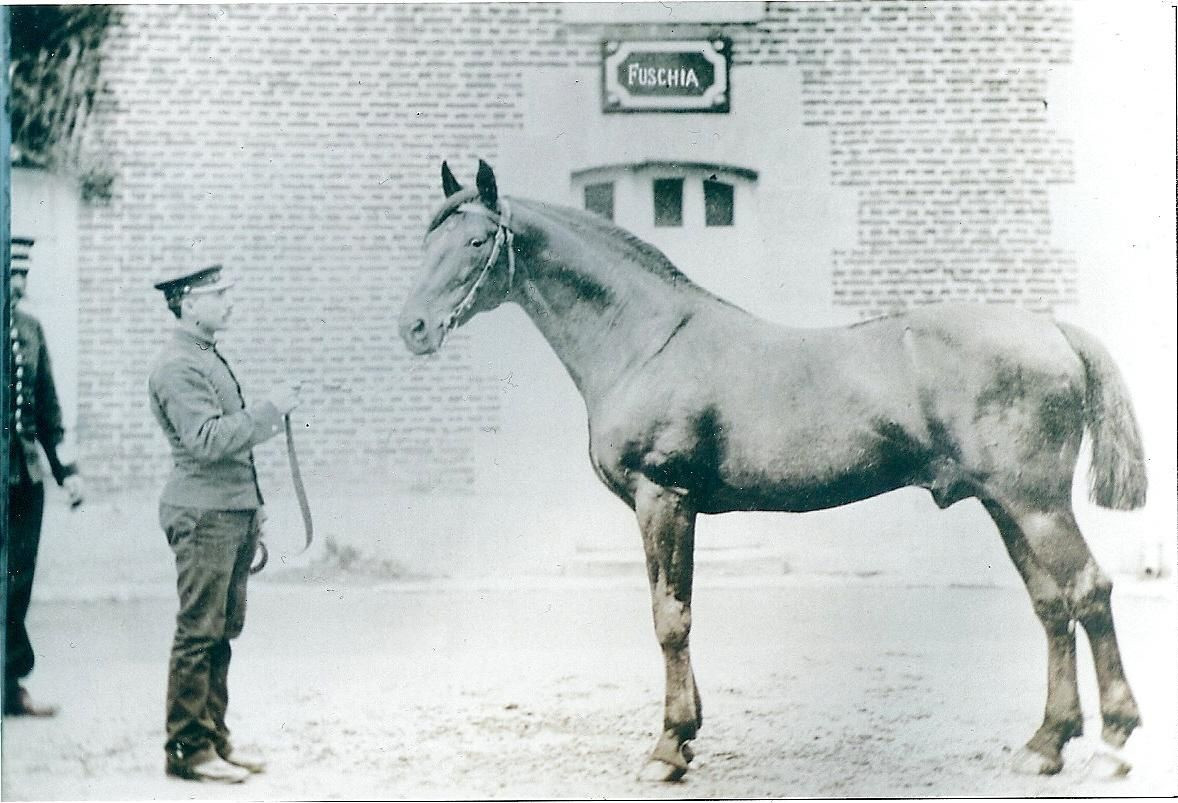
Fuschia

According to Count Henry de Robien, Fuschia owes his existence to M. de Parcevaux, a former stud farm inspector of Breton origin, who had the Reynolds stallion on his books at the La Roche-sur-Yon stallion depot. As the stallion had no success in the Vendée, he was transferred to the Saint-Lô stallion depot. Reynolds bred from 1880 to 1896, mainly at the Sainte-Marie-du-Mont breeding station.

Fuschia was born in 1883 to Mr. J. Gosselin, a rather modest breeder based in Saint-Côme-du-Mont, Manche. According to Jean-Pierre Reynaldo, he was an "ordinary, not to say ugly" foal, who consequently found no buyers when he was weaned. His owner trained him in mounted trotting before entrusting him to Ferdinand Dufour at Pont-l'Évêque, and the two men raced him between the ages of 3 and 5.

Fuschia is reputed to be an excellent racing trotter, with 29,780 francs in winnings and 17 victories in 20 races, for a kilometer reduction record of 1 min 35 s at Veulettes, and 1 min 36 s at Rouen. In 1886, Fuschia won 9 of the 10 races in which he took part (with one second place), for earnings of 9,000 francs. Mr. Gosselin turned down an offer from an American buyer, Mr. Maassen, for 33,000 francs.

The 1888 season was not as good, as Fuschia could only be put back in condition at the very end of the season, due to leg problems which required the application of an "energetic fire". The young stallion competed in three races at the end of 1888, which resulted in a second place, a dead-heat with the horse Norma, and a victory.

Fuschia suffered an early muscle strain, and arrived at the Haras national du Pin at the age of 6, sold by his owner for the sum of 11,000 francs; according to Reynaldo, Mr. Gosselin's motivation was to prevent his horse from being sold abroad.

Fuschia was put to stud in 1889 by the Haras du Pin, which stationed him at Le Mêle-sur-Sarthe. According to the Annuaire de la Normandie, the initial reception given to the young stallion Fuschia was "very reserved; in spite of his undoubted quality, breeders in this country were afraid of introducing into their breed a stallion who could not give them good offspring".

He reproduced until 1908, when he was slaughtered at Haras du Pin in August. He was top of the list of French Trotter stallions from 1893 to 1906. His success as a stallion was such that, for the first time in their history, the Haras Nationaux had to draw lots to distribute cards granting the right to stud. In 1900, according to Caen veterinarian Alfred Gallier, the number of requests for Fuschia and Harley to be covered by a brood mare exceeded the natural possibilities of these two stallions. In recent breeding years, trotting mares capable of a mileage reduction of less than 1 min 40 s are prioritized for covering. In recent years, the Haras du Pin region has also been full of foals sired by Fuschia.

According to Reynaldo, Mr. Gosselin "never got over" selling his best horse to the stud, and died a year before Fuschia, on 22 April 1907.

== Description ==
Fuschia is universally described as inelegant, even ugly. He reached a height of 1.61 m as an adult, which was rather large for his time. His coat was bay.

On 7 April 1900, Le Sport universel illustré magazine described him as a trotter with sloping spokes and regular conformation. The neck and shoulder are long, the chest deep, the hip sloping, the toplineage well supported, the loins well conformed, but the back is judged a little too long. Criticism focuses on its "common" appearance, with a head considered very ugly, and limb extremities betraying a lack of blood.

== Origins ==
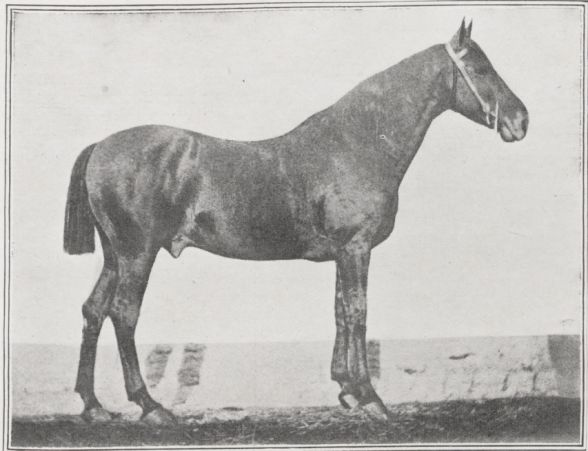
Conquérant (b. 1858), Fuschia's paternal grandfather

Fuschia is a cross between the Thoroughbred and the Norfolk Trotter. He is a son of the French Trotter stallion Reynolds, and the mare Rêveuse, by Lavater. His breeder bought the mare Symphonie (or Sympathie) at the Tattersall horse market sales, and had her covered by the stallion Lavater, who had a reputation for producing ugly foals. He thus obtained Fuschia's dam, Rêveuse.

The mare Lady Pierce was sold by an American trotting competitor on the promise that she would be able to achieve a mile reduction of 1 min 40 sec. Her daughter Miss Pierce became the first trotting mare born in France to reach 1 min 40 s. Great hopes are placed in the result of the cross between Miss Pierce and the stallion Conquérant, the sire of Fuschia. This horse is named "Reynolds" after the American who sold the mare Lady Pierce. Reynolds proved disappointing on the track, achieving a kilometer reduction of just 1 min 56 s.

Fuschia is a grandson of Conquérant, and therefore by him of Young Rattler, out of the Godolphin Arabian lineage. By Success, he is also a descendant of The Norfolk Phœnomenon. Seven of his thirty direct ancestors are Thoroughbreds; taking into account his ancestors of unknown origin, Fuschia has between 35 and 40% Thoroughbred origins.

Pedigree of Fuschia
Sire Reynolds (1873)	Conquérant (1858–1880)	Kapirat (1844–1870)	Voltaire (1833)
Sire Reynolds (1873)	Conquérant (1858–1880)	Kapirat (1844–1870)	La Juggler (1838)
Sire Reynolds (1873)	Conquérant (1858–1880)	Élisa (1853–1881)	Corsair (1845)
Sire Reynolds (1873)	Conquérant (1858–1880)	Élisa (1853–1881)	Élise (1831)
Sire Reynolds (1873)	Miss Pierce (1857)	Succès (1852)	Telegraph (1844)
Sire Reynolds (1873)	Miss Pierce (1857)	Succès (1852)	La Juggler (1838)
Sire Reynolds (1873)	Miss Pierce (1857)	Lady Pierce (1850)	Henry Clay (1837)
Sire Reynolds (1873)	Miss Pierce (1857)	Lady Pierce (1850)	Fille de Diamond (1840)
Dam Rêveuse (1878)	Lavater (1867–1887)	Y. (1858)	the Norfolk Phœnomenon (1845–1872)
Dam Rêveuse (1878)	Lavater (1867–1887)	Y. (1858)	No info
Dam Rêveuse (1878)	Lavater (1867–1887)	Crocus (1858)	Hood's Fireaway (1852)
Dam Rêveuse (1878)	Lavater (1867–1887)	Crocus (1858)	Fire Phenomenon (1840)
Dam Rêveuse (1878)	Sympathie (1862)	Pédagogue (1854)	Nuncio (1839)
Dam Rêveuse (1878)	Sympathie (1862)	Pédagogue (1854)	No info
Dam Rêveuse (1878)	Sympathie (1862)	No info	No info
Dam Rêveuse (1878)	Sympathie (1862)	No info	No info

When he established his classification of trotter families in 1908, the creator of the French Trotter studbook Louis Cauchois attributed one of them to Fuschia. This historical classification is still used more than a hundred years later, despite one discrepancy: Fuschia is not a founder of the French Trotter lineage, but a member of the Conquérant lineage. Alban d'Hauthuille, in his study Les courses de chevaux published in 1982 in the PUF Que sais-je? collection, mentions five lineages of French Trotters and links "the famous Fuschia" to that of Conquérant. Zootechnician Paul Dechambre (1921) links him to one of the two branches of English half-breeds descended from Young Rattler, by Impérieuse.

== Descendants ==
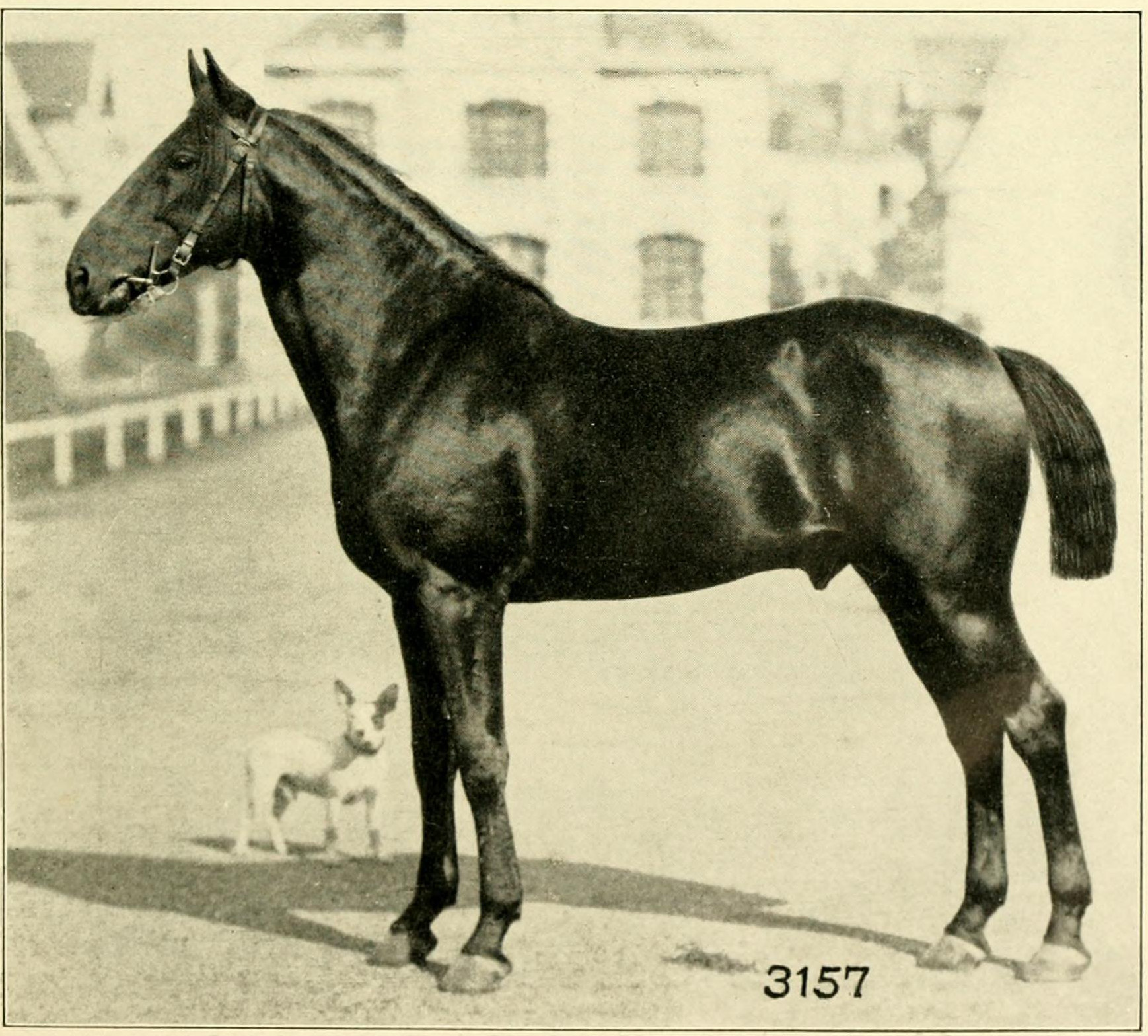
Narquois, Fuschia's foal (b. 1891)

The annals of the 1897 parliamentary debates mention "Fuschia, [...] this stallion whose offspring everyone clamors for. He is so highly regarded that this year [1898] he already has sixty-five mares to accept". In 1898, of the 28 three-year-old trotters tested who ran a kilometer in under 1 min 40 s, eight were sons of Fuschia. The winners of the Derby des trotteurs de Rouen, one of the great classics of the era, were, with one exception, exclusively sired by him from 1893 to 1905. In their study L'agriculture et les institutions agricoles du monde au début du xxe siècle (published in 1906), Louis Grandeau and Charles de Saint-Cyr estimate that "never in the world has a half-blood stallion produced so many winners". In fact, his foals sold at a very high price for the time: on average from 7,000 to 10,000 francs, with some reaching 12,000 to 15,000 francs. By comparison, foals from ordinary mares and stallions sell for between 2,000 and 7,000 francs, while Fuschia's foals never sell for less than 5,000 francs.

Fuschia's foals (1883–1908)
Narquois (1891–1911)	Nitouche (1891)	Océanie (1892)	Quartier-Maître (1894)	Réséda (1895)	Travailleur (1897)	Trinqueur (1897)	Alérion (1900)	Bégonia (1901)	Bémécourt (1901–1922)	Byzance (1901)

R. Robert considers him to be "the true father" of the French Trotter breed, as "it can be said that at the present time [in 1955] there is not a single French Trotter who does not claim Fuschia blood". Reynaldo cites him as "indisputably the greatest French stallion". According to Maurice O'Neill (1949), during his stallion career at the Haras national du Pin, Fuschia assumed such importance in Normandy horse breeding from 1890 onwards "that there is not, today, a French Trotter who is not strongly 'inbred' to him". Reynaldo compares his impact on trotter breeding in France to that of the stallion Peter the Great in the United States. Daniel Faucher declared in 1952 that 9/10 of French Trotters were sired by Fuschia.

Fuschia sired almost 400 trotters, giving a total of 390 licensed trotters, 115 of whom became stallions in their turn. Fuschia's stallions were mainly distributed in the Caen plain, but also in regions other than Normandy: in 1900, the stallion depot at La Roche-sur-Yon had three sons of Fuschia (Mars, Nangis and Orphelin). He is reputed to have produced good trotters by crossing with Phaéton daughters; the classic cross from which the successful French Trotters of the early 20th century are descended is in fact the result of crossing Fuschia's lineage with that of Phaéton.

According to Haras Georges Bonnefont, Fuschia's offspring have a "common" appearance, a heavy head and lymphatic tissues, unless crossed with a Thoroughbred mare. This was also the opinion published in 1894 in La Quinzaine littéraire: "Cet étalon commun fait de vilaines têtes greffées sur des encolures trop courtes" ("This common stallion makes ugly heads grafted onto necks that are too short"). In his book Les Bêtes, ces inconnues (1954), Jean Éparvier cites a stallion named "Fuschia" (although we don't know if it's this one or another), who would only cover chestnut mares.

=== Place in the Conquérant lineage ===
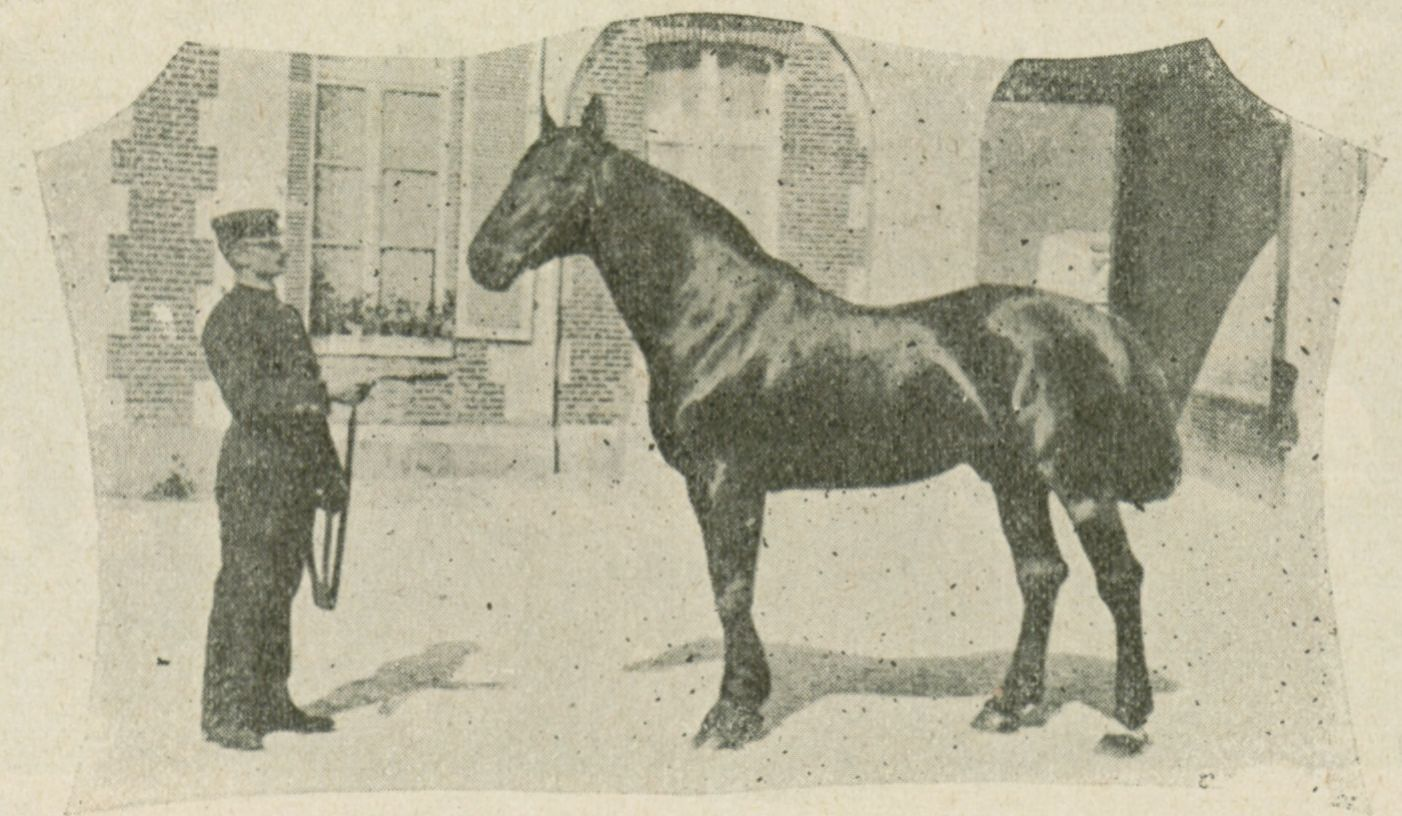
Fuschia

Jean-Pierre Reynaldo has drawn up a classification of the French Trotter's remaining male bloodlines. The Conquérant lineage is numbered I, with Fuschia present in all the remaining branches (6 in all). By 1905, Fuschia had become such a successful sire that his Conquérant lineage accounted for 40% of all French Trotteur lineages.

Two of Fuschia's sons, in particular, perpetuate this lineage: the stallions Narquois and Bémécourt. The first four branches of Conquérant's lineage are descended from Bémécourt, the next two being two branches descended from Narquois. Fandango, one of these descendants, gave rise to the "e" branch of this lineage.

Conquérant (1858)
Fuschia (1883)
Narquois (1891)			Bémécourt (1901)	
Beaumanoir (1901)	Loudéac (1933)	Fandango (1949)	Hernani III (1929)	Intermède (1908)
Beaumanoir (1901)	Loudéac (1933)	Fandango (1949)	Quinio (1938)	Quiproquo II (1938)
Beaumanoir (1901)	Loudéac (1933)	Fandango (1949)	Kerjacques (1954)	Quiproquo II (1938)

== Tributes ==
An important mounted trotting race, the Prix Ellora, was renamed in his honor at the end of the 19th century. It still existed in 1961.

== Bibliography ==
- Baume, Louis (1913). Influence des courses au trot sur la production chevaline en France (in French). Paris: Bureaux de la "France chevaline".
- Cauchois, Louis (1908). Les familles de trotteurs: classification des trotteurs français en familles maternelles numéretées, tables généalogiques et historique des principales familles [Trotter families: classification of French trotters into numbered maternal families, genealogical tables and history of the main families] (in French). Aux bureau de La France chevaline.
- de Choin, Pierre (1912). Le haras et la circonscription du dépôt d'étalons à Saint-Lô: avec 15 figures et une carte (in French). Paris: J.-P. Baillière et fils.
- Gallier, Alfred (1900). Le cheval Anglo-Normand: avec photogravures intercalées dans le texte (in French). Paris: Baillière.
- Nicard, Édouard (1898). Le pur sang anglais et le trotteur français devant le transformisme (in French). Mazeron frères.
- Reynaldo, Jean-Pierre (2015). Le trotteur français: Histoire des courses au trot en France des origines à nos jours (in French). Éditions Lavauzelle.
