= Hippology =

Study of horses

Hippology (from Greek: ἵππος, hippos, "horse"; and λόγος, logos, "study") is the study of horses.

Today, hippology is the title of an equine veterinary and management knowledge contest that is used in 4-H, Future Farmers of America (FFA), and many horse breed contests. Hippology consists of four phases: horse judging, written examination and slide identification, ID stations, and team problem-solving. Many people across the United States and in other countries compete in hippology-related knowledge competitions annually. Items covered in the contest may cover any equine subject, including reproduction, training, parasites, dressage, history and origins, anatomy and physiology, driving and harnessing, horse industry, horse management, breeds, genetics, western games, colors, famous horses in history, parts of the saddle, types of bits, gaits, competitions, poisonous plants, and nutrition.

== Judging ==
The judging phase generally includes judging both a halter class and an "under saddle" class (such as western pleasure, hunter under saddle, etc.). The classes involve four horses and contestants are given a judging card to place the horses. Unlike the horse judging competitions, hippology competitors are not expected to give reasons, but only place the classes.

== Written examination and slide identification ==
The written examination is a multiple-choice, 50-question test. The written examination can cover any of the topics and any of the information from the designated sources. The slide identification is composed of 25 slides.

== ID stations ==
The ID station phase includes 10 stations, each with 10 pictures or objects to be identified along with a list of multiple-choice answers. Each station has a theme (anatomy, poisonous plants, tack, etc.). A time limit exists allotting only 2 minutes per station.

== Team problem solving ==
The team problem solving phase requires a team, with three or four members, to present their solution for a problem to a judge or judges. The team is given 10–15 minutes to discuss the problem, form a solution, and prepare their presentation. No written materials are allowed. They then have an average of 5 minutes to present their solution. Members are judged on their teamwork (especially during the discussion phase), the accuracy of their solution, and their presentation skills. No coaches or any adults are allowed in the room during the team problem.

== Hippology in 4-H ==
In 4-H, hippology teams consist of 3 or 4 members. (In the case of a team with 4 members, the lowest score is dropped.) Teams compete at a regional level, where the first place team advances to compete against the other region winners at a state level. The winner of the state level then advances to either Eastern Nationals in Kentucky, or Western Nationals in Colorado, depending on the state.

== See also ==
- Horse breeding
- Horse training
