= French Trotter =

French breed of trotting horse

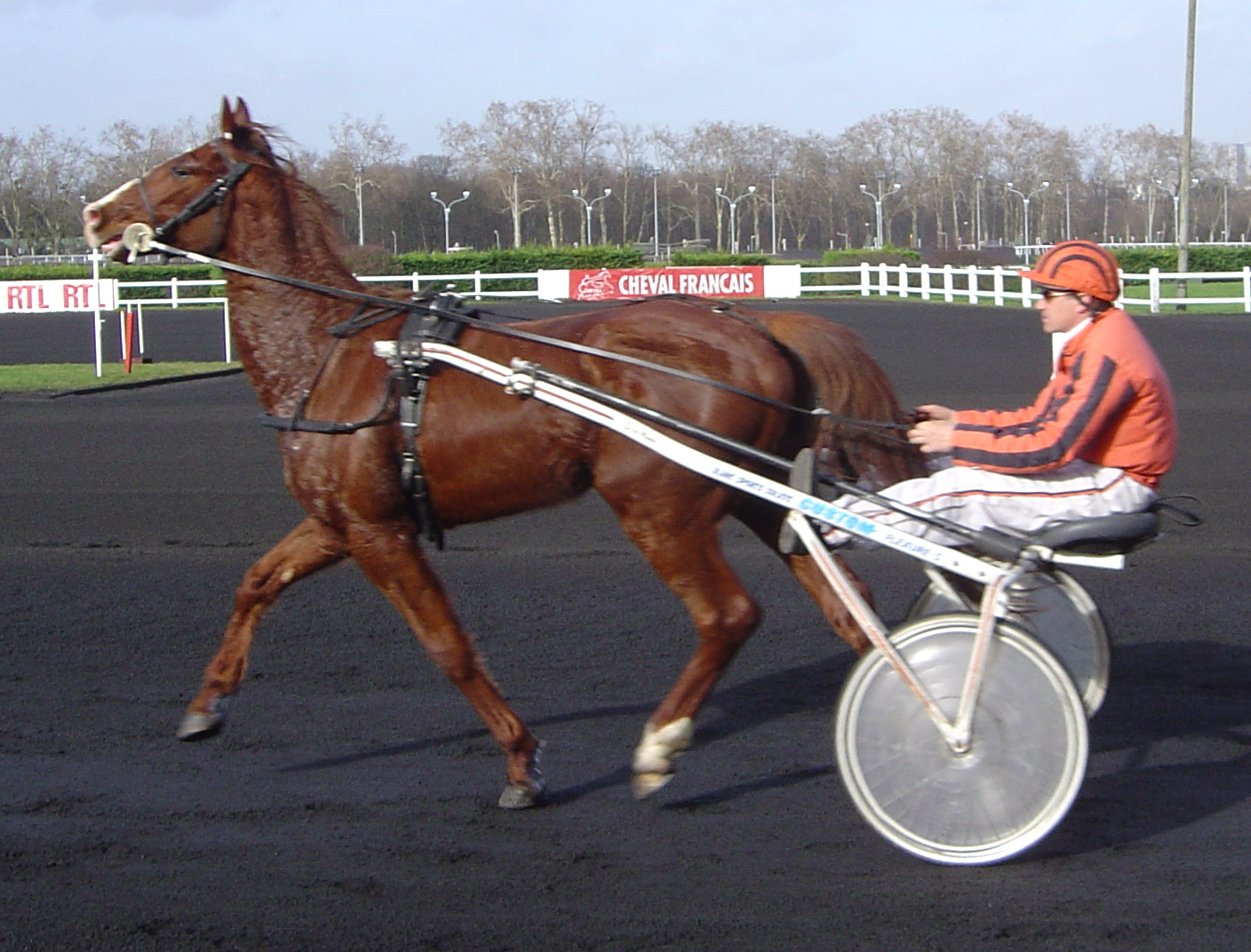
- Sulky racing at the Hippodrome de Vincennes

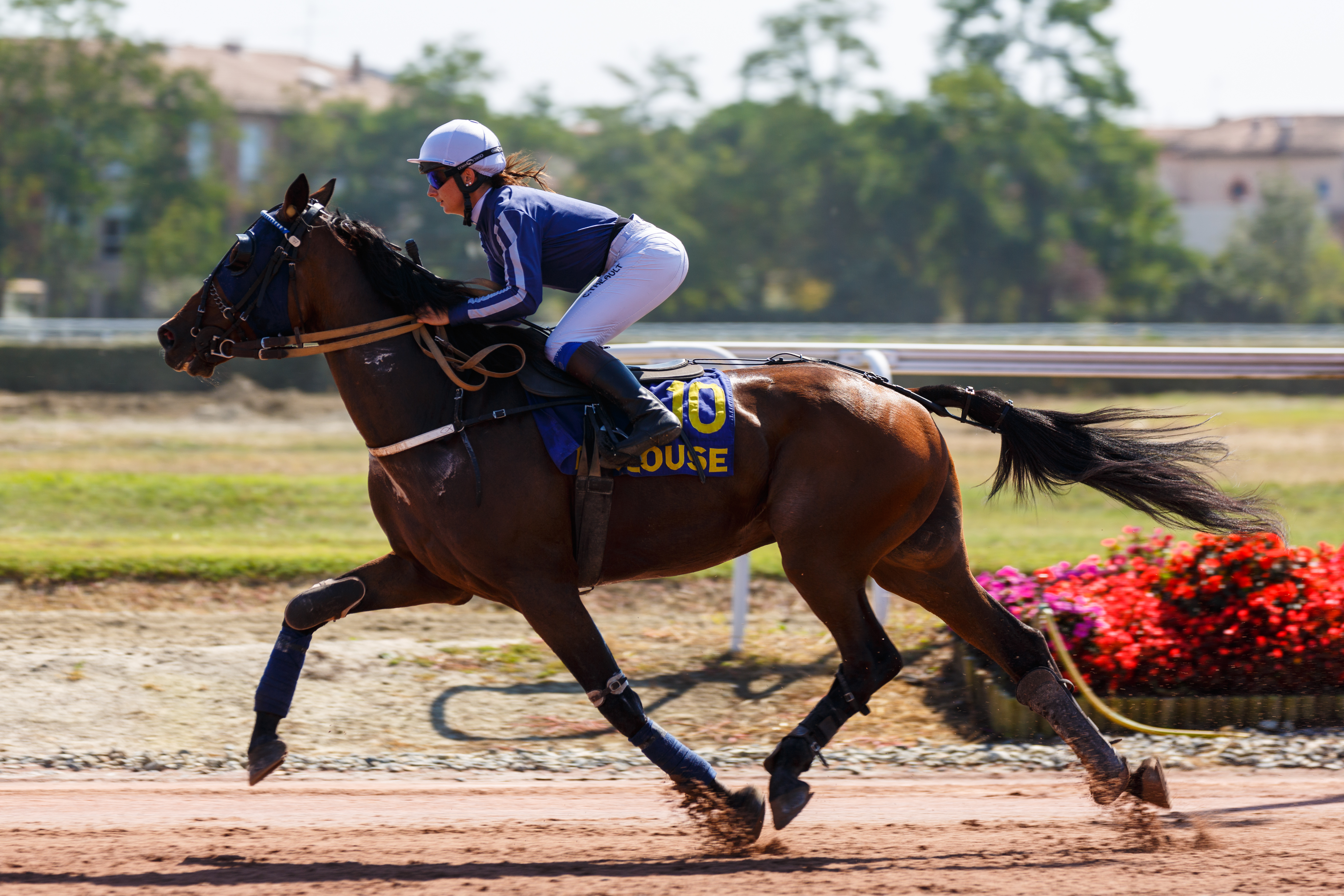
- Caroline Théault on Vezac Duophi at Toulouse La Cépière in 2016
- Conservation status: FAO (2007): not at risk
- Other names: Trotteur français; Anglo-Norman Trotter; Norman Trotter
- Country of origin: France
- Standard: [no standard]
- Use: trotting races

Traits
- Height: 154–167 cm
- Colour: solid dark colours

The French Trotter or Trotteur Français is a French breed of trotting horse bred for racing at the trot, either ridden or in harness. It was bred specifically for racing in the nineteenth century, principally in Normandy in north-western France.

== History ==
Ridden trotting races in France were first held at the Champ de Mars of Paris in 1806. Selective breeding of trotting racehorses began in Normandy in the latter half of the nineteenth century. Initial breeding of what would become the French Trotter was based on the local Carrossier Normand, a now-extinct forerunner of the Norman Cob; outside influences were from British Hackney, Norfolk Trotter, Thoroughbred and half-bred hunter stallions, and later from the American Standardbred.

A stud-book for the French Trotter was started in 1906; eligibility for registration was determined by performance. The breed received official recognition in 1922. In 1937 the stud-book was closed to horses not bred in France; a small number of registrations of cross-bred horses with Standardbred blood has since been permitted.

== Characteristics ==
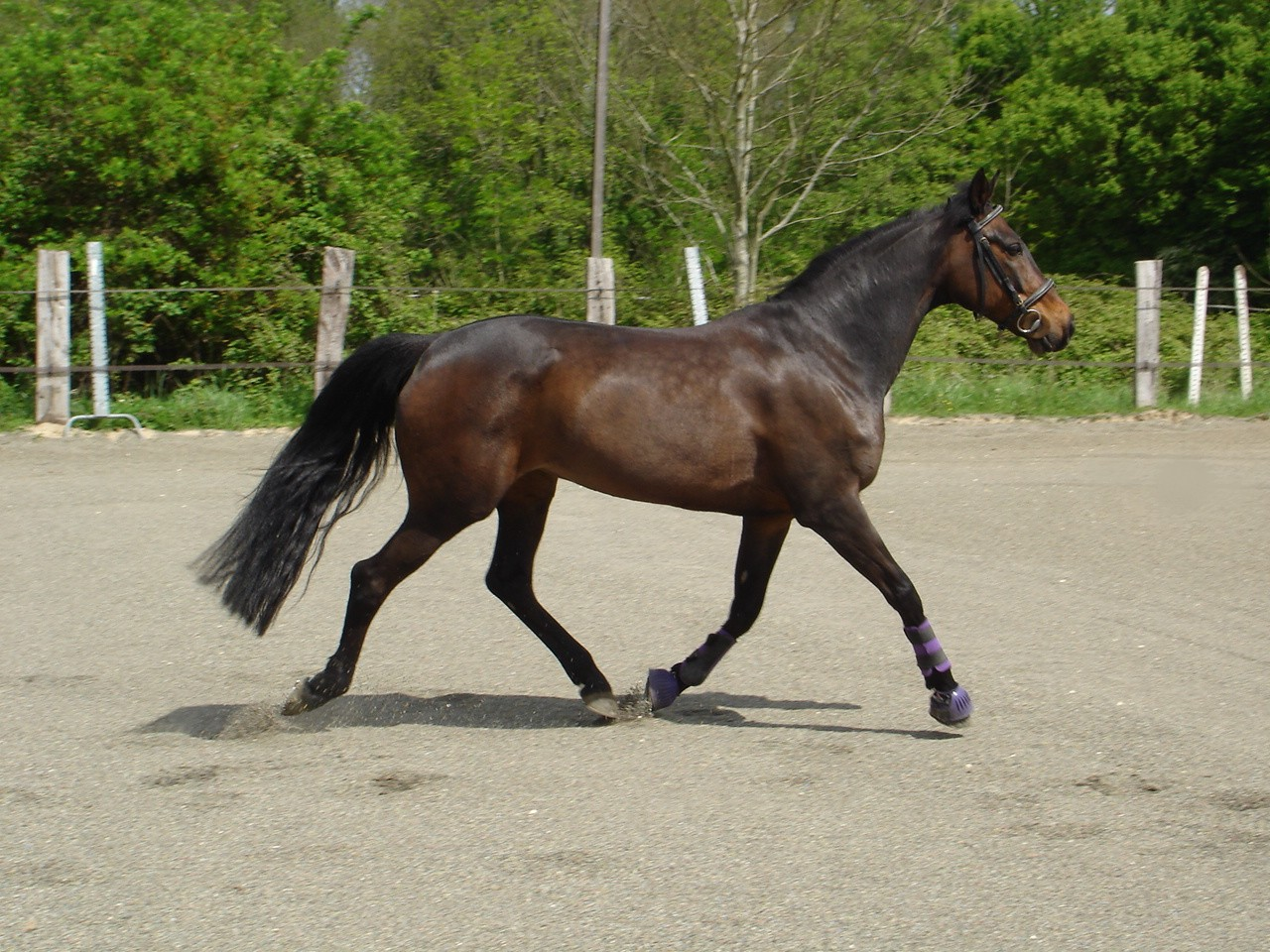

There is no breed standard for the French Trotter. It is compact and of medium size – usually between about 154 and 167 cm at the withers – and is most often chestnut or bay. The shoulder is sloped and the sternum prominent. The facial profile is straight.

Despite the influence of the American Standardbred, which is predominantly a lateral pacing breed, the French Trotter performs an ordinary diagonal trot. It has greater stamina and endurance than the Standardbred; it reaches maturity more slowly, but may have a longer life as a racer. It can carry considerable weight, and excels in mounted racing at the trot.

== Use ==
Approximately one third of the foals born each year are eventually selected for racing. They may be raced either in harness to sulkies, or ridden; about ninety per cent of races are in harness. The principal French trotting races are the Prix de Cornulier for ridden trotters, and the Prix d'Amérique for sulky racers. A few horses excel in both types of race; by 1995, four horses had won the top prize in both disciplines.

The horses not selected as racers may be used for riding, for trekking, in show-jumping or for mounted hunting.
