= Norfolk Trotter =

Breed of horse

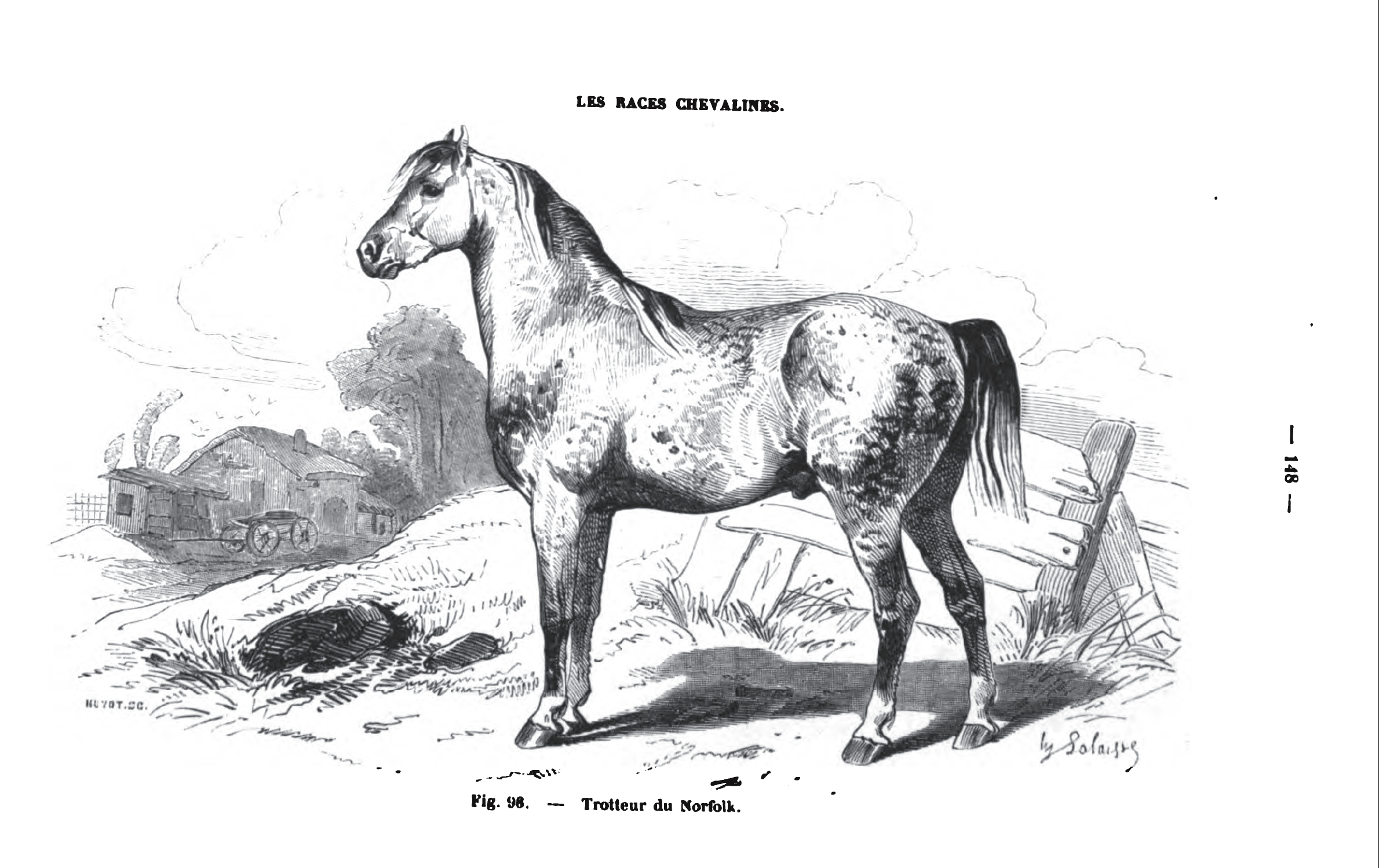
Norfolk Trotter

The Norfolk Trotter is a historical horse breed once native to East Anglia and Norfolk, England. It was said to be "a large-sized trotting harness horse originating in and around Norfolk".

In 1542, King Henry VIII required the wealthy to keep a specified number of trotting-horse stallions. The breed was well established in Norfolk, and later became known as the Norfolk Trotter. The most influential sire in its history is the half-bred stallion Shales (foaled 1755), also known as "Old Shales". Shales' Thoroughbred sire, Blaze (foaled 1733), was a son of the great racehorse Flying Childers (a descendant of the Darley Arabian, one of the three foundation sires of the Thoroughbred).

The Norfolk Trotter became the all-around travel horse in England at this time. In Yorkshire, the same breed was known as the Yorkshire Trotter. Both breeds were also known as roadsters. The term Norfolk/Yorkshire Roadster/Trotter is seen commonly in breed-history books; regardless of the name, all are the same breed of horse. They were used under saddle as the quickest means of travel in areas with no established roads. The breed was known for its ability to carry a heavy man for great distances at speeds up to 17 mph. Trotting races (usually under saddle), were very popular in the early part of the 19th century, and Norfolk Trotters excelled in them.

A Norfolk Trotter stallion, Bellfounder, was imported to America in 1822, and proved a major influence in the founding of the Standardbred by becoming the dam sire of Hambletonian 10. Norfolk Trotters also strongly influenced today's modern Hackney horse.
