= Call of Duty 3 =

2006 video game

- Packaging artwork released for all territories
- Developer: Treyarch (Note: Wii version co-developed by Exakt Entertainment)
- Publisher: Activision
- Director: Richard Farrelly
- Producers: Jason Blundell; Nick Falzon
- Artists: Brian Anderson; Alex Bortoluzzi
- Writer: Marc Guggenheim
- Composer: Joel Goldsmith
- Series: Call of Duty
- Engine: Treyarch NGL
- Platforms: PlayStation 2; Xbox; Xbox 360; PlayStation 3; Wii
- Release: PlayStation 2, Xbox & Xbox 360: NA: November 7, 2006; EU: November 10, 2006; AU: November 15, 2006 (X360); AU: November 22, 2006; EU: November 24, 2006 (PS2); Wii & PlayStation 3: NA: November 17, 2006 (PS3); NA: November 19, 2006 (Wii); AU: December 7, 2006 (Wii); EU: December 8, 2006 (Wii); PAL: March 23, 2007 (PS3); JP: June 14, 2007 (PS3)
- Genre: First-person shooter
- Modes: Single-player, multiplayer

Call of Duty 3 is a 2006 first-person shooter game developed by Treyarch and published by Activision. It is the third major installment in the Call of Duty series. It was released for PlayStation 2, Xbox, Xbox 360, PlayStation 3 and Wii. It was a launch title for the PlayStation 3 and Wii in North America, Europe and Australia. It is also the only major installment to not release on PC.

The game received positive reviews on release and received several awards and nominations. Retrospective assessments have been more negative, with critics criticizing the game for lacking in innovation following its predecessors, although some noted the game featured elements that would be incorporated into later games in the series. Call of Duty 3 has placed low in lists ranking the series' games.

== Gameplay ==
Call of Duty 3 is a historical first-person shooter game that has a single-player campaign mode and multiplayer mode. It is open-ended, giving the player multiple paths to complete objectives, but plays similarly to the series' previous installment. Players fight alongside AI-controlled teammates against enemies who use various attack patterns, hide behind cover, and regroup to improved defensive positions.

A character can be positioned in one of three stances: standing, crouching, or prone, each affecting the player's rate of movement and accuracy. Two firearms can be carried, and both fragmentation and smoke grenades can also be equipped; unlike previous installments in the series, players have the ability to toss live grenades back at the enemy. Weapons and ammo from fallen foes or friendlies can be picked up to replace weapons in a player's inventory. A player may fire from the hip or aim down the gun's iron sights for increased accuracy. The compass on the heads-up display (HUD) helps the player navigate to the location of each objective.

Using cover helps the player avoid enemy fire or recover health after taking significant damage. Similar to Call of Duty 2, the edges of the screen turn red and the character's heartbeat will increase in volume, indicating that the player's health is low; it can be replenished through an automatic recovery system when the character is not taking fire.

=== Campaign ===
The player takes the perspective of either an American, British, Canadian, or Polish soldier during the single-player campaign, for a total of 14 missions. Set in the Western Front of World War II, Call of Duty 3 takes place in the year 1944 and contains missions specific to four major Allied campaigns in the Battle of Normandy. The player takes part in a series of objectives marked by their HUD; these include having the character arrive at a checkpoint, eliminate enemies in a specified location, manning a tank, and marking targets for air strikes. Call of Duty 3 introduces to the series scripted close-combat sequences and multiple actions to arming explosives, both of which require the player to press buttons in sequences to progress.

=== Multiplayer ===
In addition to the single-player campaign, Call of Duty 3 features a wide range of multiplayer modes for players to participate in – each team allowing up to 24 on the PlayStation 3 and the Xbox 360, and 16 for the PlayStation 2 and Xbox in a single match. This is only in the online mode. All team game modes feature the soldiers of the Allied nations versus those of the Axis. Multiplayer features are absent from the Wii edition.

It is the first game in the Call of Duty series to introduce two different game modes. The "Normalized" mode was added to allow console players a way to adjust to the smaller kill box of Call of Duty, its expansion United Offensive, and Call of Duty 2.

On the Xbox 360, Call of Duty 3 divides its multiplayer aspect into Player and Ranked matches. Player matches allow players to invite other players into their games, but do not contribute points toward the leader board or unlock Achievements. Ranked matches put the player with and against teams of random players, and contribute towards player points and allow players to unlock Achievements.

In line with other online-enabled games on the original Xbox, multiplayer for Call of Duty 3 on Xbox Live was available to players until April 15, 2010. The game is now playable online on the replacement Xbox Live servers called Insignia.

== Plot ==
=== American campaign ===
In the American campaign, the player controls Private Nichols, a replacement for the 29th Infantry Division. The squad participates in the final offensive in the capture of Saint-Lô, where they meet Pfc. Salvadore Guzzo, a radio operator who becomes a part of the squad. Afterwards, the squad is transferred to the 90th Infantry Division as reinforcements to help secure Saint-Germain-sur-Sèves in heavy hedgerow fighting.

The squad assaults Mayenne to capture its bridge before the Germans could destroy it. Private Huxley is wounded in the fighting, forcing Sergeant Frank McCullin to disarm the German bombs rigged to the bridge in his place, but is mortally wounded. Corporal Mike Dixon is promoted to Sergeant and assumes command. Shortly after, the squad is sent to clear out Forêt d'Écouves and to locate a company of combat engineers; a surviving engineer reveals that their supply depot was overrun. The squad recaptures the depot and destroys a German roadblock. They then aid in the liberation of a crossroads at Le Bourg-Saint-Léonard, trapping the remaining German forces by closing the Falaise Pocket, before being ordered to defend Chambois against those retreating.

At Chambois, the American forces hold off against the Germans. Guzzo attempts to call for air support, but is wounded. Nichols and Dixon rescue him as air support arrives, but Dixon is shot and killed. Guzzo takes command and the squad fights through the rest of the town and hold off against the final attack as American reinforcements force the Germans to surrender. Two days later, Guzzo is promoted to Sergeant as the new squad later with Nichols and Huxley also promoted to Corporal. Four days later, Allied forces liberate Paris.

=== British/French Resistance campaign ===
In the British/French campaign, the player controls Sergeant James Doyle, a returning character from Call of Duty: United Offensive and a member of the British SAS, who are to be sent to France to assist the local Maquis Resistance. He is reunited with Major Tiberius Ingram (also returning from Call of Duty: United Offensive) and joined by Corporal Duncan Keith.

Parachuting in near Toucy after their Handley Page Halifax is shot down, Doyle is rescued by Pierre LaRoche, the Maquis leader, and later recover one of their jeeps to regroup with resistance member Isabelle DuFontaine. The group assaults a manor house to free a captured Maquis member, Marcel as well as destroying the FlaK 88s before escaping on the jeeps.

The SAS and Maquis launch a raid on a German-held fuel plant at Autun and succeed in destroying its fuel and facilities. Doyle, Keith, Isabelle and Marcel escape in a German vehicle, but Ingram's vehicle is blown away and he is presumed killed. The group later receives information that Ingram is alive and being held captive in a nearby village. The SAS and the Maquis fighters rescue Ingram and several captured Maquis, before fending off a German counterattack, during which Isabelle is killed attempting to destroy a German armoured car.

=== Canadian campaign ===
In the Canadian campaign, the player controls Private Joseph Cole of The Argyll and Sutherland Highlanders of Canada, who is in an infantry platoon led by WW1 veteran Lieutenant Jean-Guy Robichaud and his second-in-command, Sergeant Jonathan Callard. The platoon is part of the 4th Canadian (Armoured) Division.

Near Tilly-la-Campagne, as part of Operation Totalize, the platoon attacks South along the Falaise road. They destroy a German artillery battery, before moving to capture a German-held industrial complex, holding off an enemy counterattack. The platoon later clears a forested area near the Laison River of several anti-tank positions and a motor pool for Allied convoys to move through. While advancing with other units to relieve Polish forces defending Hill 262, Private Leslie Baron is assigned to the Polish 1st Armored Division to replace their radio operator.

Cole's platoon frees a captured Canadian tank crew in the battle for St. Lambert-sur-Dives, and with their help captures the town. The platoon is attacked by a King Tiger tank, and the platoon flanks around it to detonate an underground German ammunition stockpile to destroy the tank. But it is discovered one of the fuses is a dud, forcing Sergeant Callard to manually detonate the charges and destroy the tank, sacrificing himself. Robichaud recommends Callard for a posthumous Victoria Cross and promotes Cole to the rank of Corporal. The unit rejoins the Canadian reinforcements to aid the Poles on Hill 262.

=== Polish campaign ===
The Polish campaign revolves around Corporal "Bohater" Wojciech, a Sherman Firefly driver in the Polish 1st Armored Division. Other members of the tank crew include: Major Stan "Papa Jack" Jackowicz, gunner Sergeant Lukasz "Bang-Boom" Kowalski, loader Corporal Joakim "Lucky Rudd" Rudinski, and radio operator Private Marek "Beksa" Ulan.

Covering the left flank of Anglo-Canadian forces, Polish forces takes part in a sweep of the French countryside near Saint-Aignan-de-Cramesnil, engaging with German armoured units. During the battle, Bohater's crew hunts down and destroys a King Tiger commanded by the tank ace known as the "Black Baron". In the following weeks, Polish forces take up defensive positions at Mont Ormel off-screen.

Later, while defending Hill 262, the crew endure an assault by the remnants of the German 7th Army in their attempt to escape the Falaise Pocket. Bohater's tank is knocked out, forcing the crew to fight on foot alongside the Polish infantry; in which Sergeant Kowalski is killed. With their position overrun, the crew and Polish soldiers retreat towards the summit of Hill 262. Baron joins them and helps provide artillery support to destroy German tanks, but is killed by German fire when he refuses to flee further. Private Ulan scavenges his radio, which is used again to call in artillery strikes. At the summit, a large counterattacking German force arrive, and Corporal Rudinski is killed. After desperate resistance, the Royal Canadian Air Force and Canadian reinforcements appear and repel the Germans, leaving Hill 262 in Allied hands.

After the battle, Lieutenant Robicheaud is talking with Major Jackowicz, saying that he and his men have done an excellent job at defending the hill, and also telling him that the Germans still have an escape route, that being Chambois.

== Downloadable content ==
Three map packs were released for the Xbox 360 multiplayer game on the Xbox Live Marketplace. The first, "Champs", was released as a free download on January 11, 2007, and contained a single self-titled map. The "Valor" map pack contained five new maps: Crossing, Ironclad, La Bourgade, Stalag 23, and Wildwood. The pack was released on January 27, 2007, for 800 MP ($10). The final map pack, "Bravo", contained five new maps of which two were remade from Call of Duty: United Offensive: Gare Centrale, Marseilles, Aller Haut, Seine River, and Rimling. The pack was released on May 31, 2007, for 800 MP. The price of the map packs was later reduced to 400 MP ($5) each.

== Development ==
Call of Duty 3 was unveiled by Activision shortly before E3 2006. It was revealed that Treyarch would be developing the title (their second in the series after Call of Duty 2: Big Red One) which was set to release later that year. The game would be running on Treyarch's own internal engine, NGL. This game served as a launch title for the PlayStation 3 and Wii in North America, Europe and Australia. It was also the only major Call of Duty installment not to be released for personal computer platforms and the only numerical sequel to date to have been a console-exclusive game alongside Big Red One and Call of Duty: Finest Hour.

In an interview with Video Gamer, Call of Duty: World at War senior producer, Noah Heller, revealed the team had eight months to develop Call of Duty 3.

== Reception ==
Reception

Aggregate score
| Aggregator | Score |
|---|---|
| Metacritic | (PS2) 82/100 (PS3) 80/100 (Wii) 69/100 (XBOX) 83/100 (X360) 82/100 |

Review scores
| Publication | Score |
|---|---|
| 1Up.com | C+ |
| Eurogamer | 7/10 |
| G4 | 3/5 |
| GameSpot | 8.2/10 |
| IGN | 8.8/10 |

Call of Duty 3 received "generally positive" reviews on all platforms except for the Wii, where it received "mixed or average" reviews, according to review aggregator website Metacritic. IGN gave a score of 8.8, while GameSpot gave an 8.2. The game won various awards from publications for best shooter and sound design. The Academy of Interactive Arts and Sciences awarded Call of Duty 3 with "Outstanding Achievement in Sound Design" during the 10th Annual Interactive Achievement Awards, along with nominations for outstanding achievement in "Art Direction", "Online Gameplay", "Original Music Composition", and "Visual Engineering".

Retrospective assessments of Call of Duty 3 have been mostly negative; it has placed low in lists ranking the series' games. Critics have criticized the game for lacking in innovation following its predecessors, although some noted the game featured elements that would be incorporated into later games in the series, such as vehicles, larger multiplayer maps, and quick-time melee events in the campaign. Due to its short development time, several agreed it was Treyarch's worst Call of Duty game but acted as a "first draft" to their superior later games.

=== Sales ===
Upon release, Call of Duty 3 was one of the best selling titles of November 2006 in the United States. The game debuted at #3 on UK charts and dropped off the top 10 list by February 2007. By the end of 2006, the game had sold approximately 1.1 million units in the US according to NPD Group. By February 3, 2007, total sales in the United States were 2 million units. The Xbox 360 and PlayStation 2 releases of Call of Duty 3 each received a "Platinum" sales award from the Entertainment and Leisure Software Publishers Association (ELSPA), indicating sales of at least 300,000 copies per version in the United Kingdom. By November 2013, the game had sold 7.2 million copies worldwide.
