= Chambois =

Chambois may refer to:

- Chambois, Orne, a commune in the department of Orne, France
  - Battle of Chambois, a World War II battle fought near Chambois
- Chambois, Eure, a commune in the department of Eure, France
