= Mont-Ormel =

- Commune
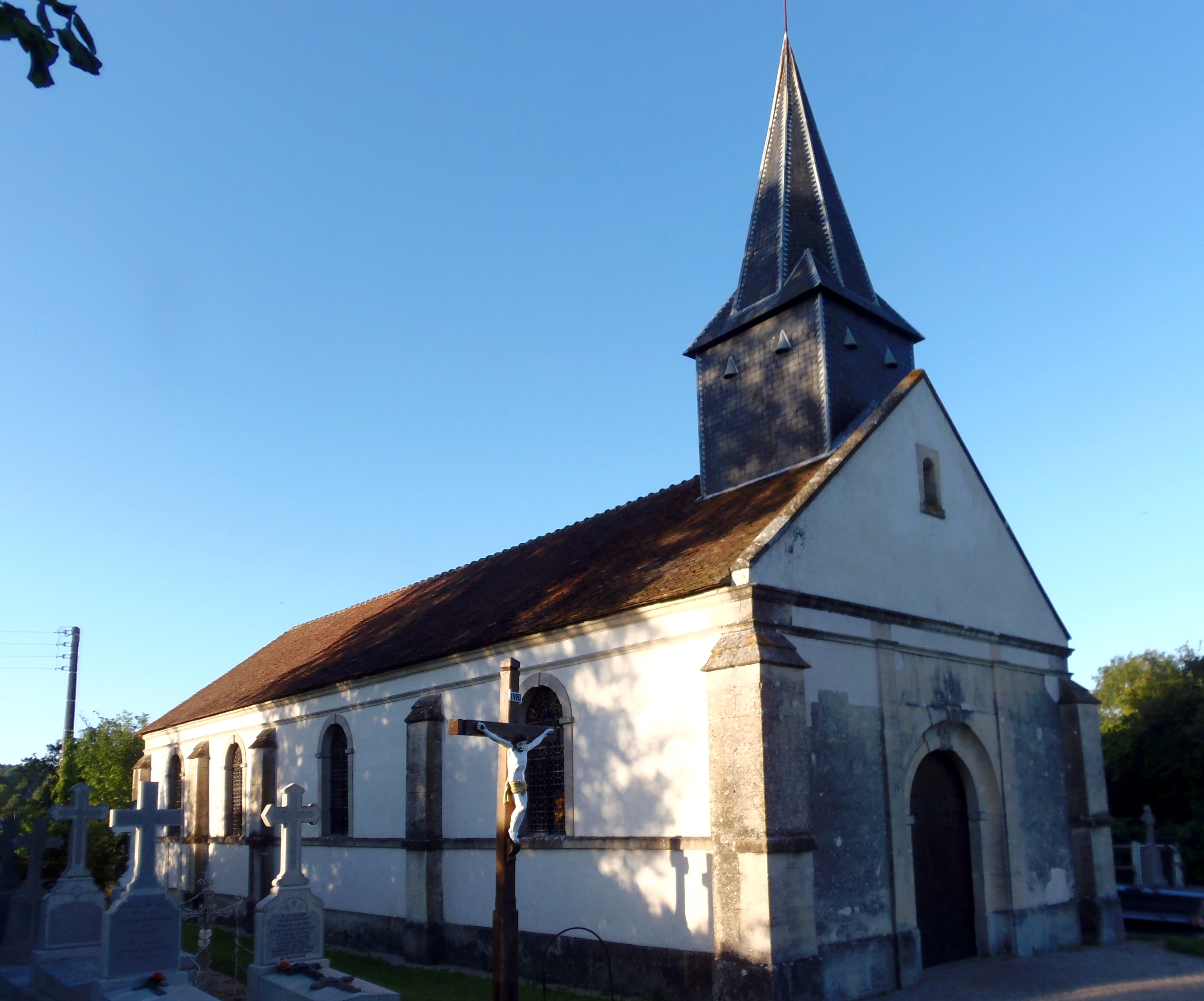
- The church in Mont-Ormel
- Location of Mont-Ormel
- Location within France Location within Normandy
- Coordinates: 48°50′26″N 0°09′24″E
- Country: France
- Region: Normandy
- Department: Orne
- Arrondissement: Argentan
- Canton: Argentan-2
- Intercommunality: Terres d'Argentan Interco

Government
  - Mayor (2020–2026): Patricia Le Feuvrier
- Area^{1}: 3.73 km^{2} (1.44 sq mi)
- Elevation: 262 m (860 ft)
- Highest elevation: 263 m (863 ft)
- Lowest elevation: 177 m (581 ft)
- Population (2023): 50
  - Density: 13/km^{2} (35/sq mi)
- Time zone: UTC+01:00 (CET)
  - Summer (DST): UTC+02:00 (CEST)
- INSEE/Postal code: 61289 /61160
- ^{1} French Land Register data, which excludes lakes, ponds, glaciers > 1 km^{2} (0.386 sq mi or 247 acres) and river estuaries.

Mont-Ormel (French pronunciation: [mɔ̃.t‿ɔʁmɛl]) is a commune in the Orne department in north-western France.

== Geography ==
The commune is made up of the following collection of villages and hamlets, La Panthelière and Mont-Ormel.

The commune has one streamsrunning through its borders, the Mont-Ormel.

== Notable buildings and places ==
Memorial de Montormel is a memorial and museum on the site of battle of Falaise pocket between Chambois and Vimoutiers.

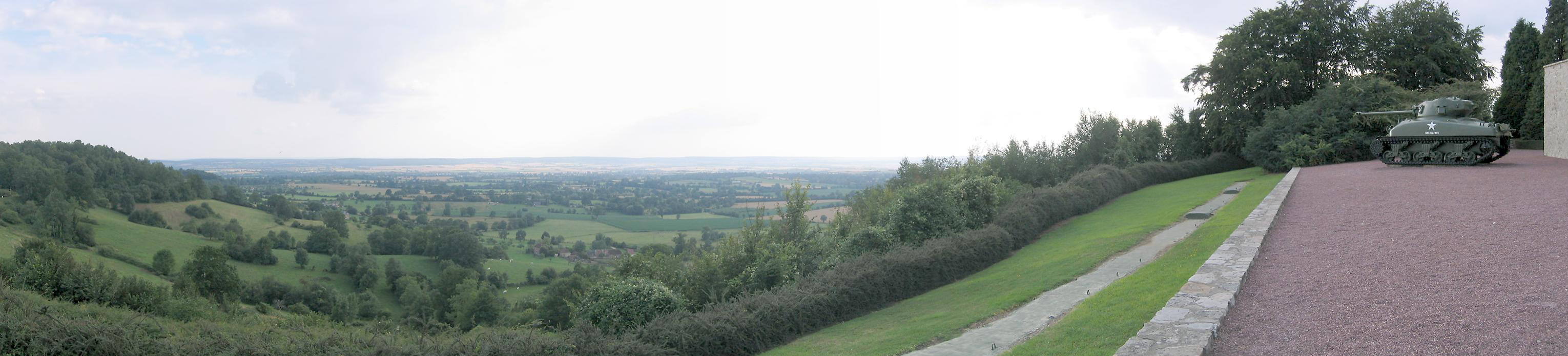
View of the battleground from the Memorial de Montormel

== See also ==
- Communes of the Orne department
