= Operation Tractable =

1944 battle in France during World War II

- Part of Operation Overlord
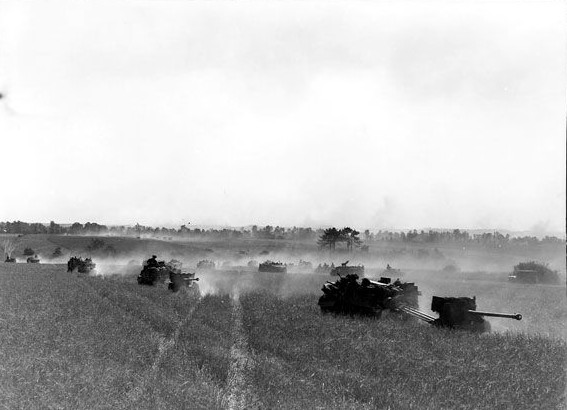
- Canadian forces moving toward Falaise on 14 August 1944
Date	14–21 August 1944
Location	North of Falaise, Normandy, France 48°53′34″N 0°11′31″W
Result	Allied victory

Belligerents
Canada; Poland; United Kingdom	Germany

Commanders and leaders
(Canada) Harry Crerar (Canada) Guy Simonds (Poland) Stanisław Maczek	(Nazi Germany) Walter Model (Nazi Germany) Kurt Meyer

Strength
2 infantry divisions 2 armoured divisions 1 armoured brigade 1 tank brigade	1 SS panzer division 2 infantry divisions

Casualties and losses
Canada: 5,500 casualties Poland: 325 killed 1,002 wounded 114 missing	2,000 killed 5,000 captured 55 tanks destroyed 152 armoured vehicles destroyed 44 guns destroyed

Operation Tractable was the final attack conducted by Canadian and Polish troops, supported by a British tank brigade, during the Battle of Normandy during World War II. The operation was to capture the tactically important French town of Falaise and then the smaller towns of Trun and Chambois. This operation was undertaken by the First Canadian Army with the 1st Polish Armoured Division (Generał brygady Stanisław Maczek) and a British armoured brigade against Army Group B of the Westheer in what became the largest encirclement on the Western Front during the Second World War. Despite a slow start and limited gains north of Falaise, novel tactics by the 1st Polish Armoured Division during the drive for Chambois enabled the Falaise Gap to be partially closed by 19 August 1944, trapping about 150,000 German soldiers in the Falaise Pocket.

Although the Falaise Gap was narrowed to a distance of several hundred metres, by attacks and counter-attacks between battle groups of the 1st Polish Armoured Division and the II SS Panzer Corps on Hill 262 (Mont Ormel) the gap was not closed quickly and thousands of German troops escaped on foot. During two days of nearly continuous fighting, the Polish forces, assisted by artillery-fire, managed to hold off counter-attacks by parts of seven German divisions in hand-to-hand fighting. On 21 August, elements of the First Canadian Army relieved the Polish survivors and sealed the Falaise Pocket by linking up with the Third US Army. This led to the surrender and capture of the remaining units of the German 7th Army in the pocket.

== Background ==
Following a break-out by the First US Army and the Third US Army from the beachhead during the Battle of Normandy after Operation Cobra on 25 July 1944, Adolf Hitler ordered a counter-offensive against the US breakout, Operation Lüttich. Lieutenant General Omar Bradley, commander of the 12th Army Group, was notified of the counter-offensive by signals deciphered via Ultra radio intercepts and prepared to defeat the counter-offensive and to encircle as much of the German force as possible. By the afternoon of 7 August, Lüttich had been defeated. Parts of the German 7th Army became further enveloped by the Allied advance out of Normandy.

Following the failure of Lüttich, the town of Falaise became an objective of the Commonwealth forces, to cut off virtually all of Army Group B (Generalfeldmarschall Günther von Kluge). General Harry Crerar, commanding the new First Canadian Army and Lieutenant-General Guy Simonds (II Canadian Corps), planned an Anglo-Canadian offensive, Operation Totalize. Totalize would rely on a night attack using the new Kangaroo armoured personnel carriers to achieve a breakthrough of German defences supported by US heavy bombers the next day. Despite gains on Verrières Ridge and near Cintheaux, the Canadian offensive stalled on 9 August, with powerful German counterattacks resulting in many casualties for the Canadian and Polish armoured and infantry divisions. By 10 August, Canadian troops had reached Hill 195, north of Falaise, but needed another set-piece attack to overcome the German defences.

== Prelude ==
=== Tactics ===
Allied gains during the Canadian offensives of Operations Totalize and Tractable

Operation Tractable incorporated lessons learned from Operation Totalize, notably the effectiveness of mechanized infantry units and tactical bombing raids by heavy bombers. Tractable was to be a daylight attack; an initial bombing raid was to weaken German defences, followed by an advance by the 4th Canadian (Armoured) Division on the western flank of Hill 195, while the 3rd Canadian Infantry Division attacked on the eastern flank with the 2nd Canadian Armoured Brigade in support. Their advance would be protected by a large smokescreen by Canadian artillery. Field Marshal Bernard Montgomery hoped that Canadian forces would achieve control of Falaise by midnight on August 14. From there, all three formations would advance towards Trun, 18 km (11 mi) east of Falaise, with the additional assistance of the 1st Polish Armoured Division, numbering approximately 10,000 men. Once in Trun, joining with the Third US Army at Chambois could be quickly accomplished.

The main defence of the road to Falaise was the 12th SS Panzer Division Hitlerjugend, which included the remnants of two infantry divisions. German forces within the Falaise Pocket approached 350,000 men. Had surprise been achieved, the Canadians would likely have succeeded in a rapid break-through. On the night of 13/14 August, a Canadian officer lost his way while moving between divisional headquarters. He drove into German lines was killed and the Germans discovered a copy of Simonds' orders on his body. As a result, the 12th SS Panzer Division placed the bulk of its remaining strength—500 grenadiers and 15 tanks, along with twelve 8.8 cm PaK 43 anti-tank guns— along the Allies' expected line of approach.

== Battle ==
=== Initial drive for Falaise ===
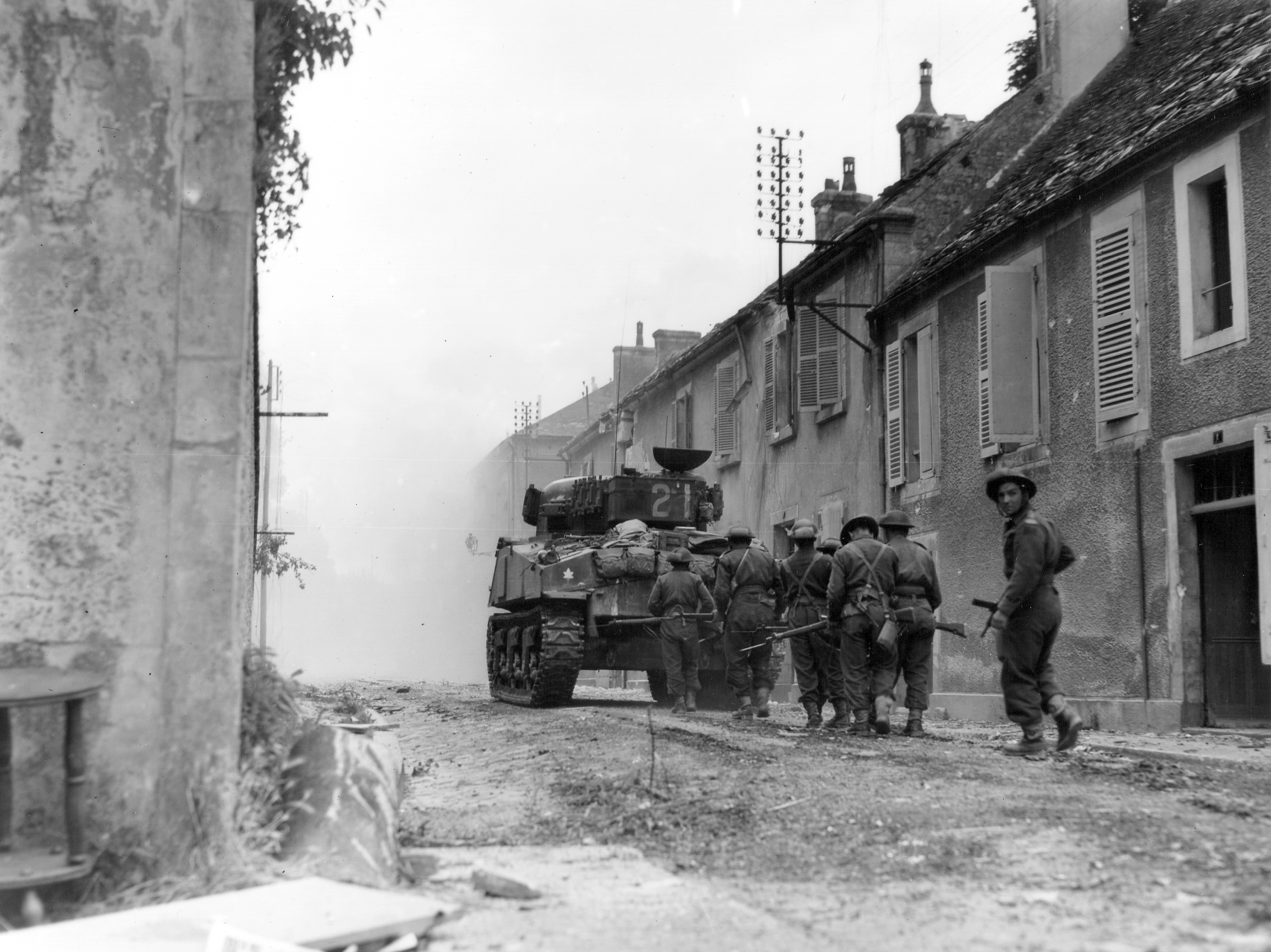
Canadian infantry from the Fusiliers Mont-Royal with armour support from the Sherbrooke Fusilier Regiment advance cautiously through the streets of Falaise, encountering only light scattered resistance

Operation Tractable began at 12:00 on 14 August, when 800 Avro Lancaster and Handley Page Halifax heavy bombers of RAF Bomber Command struck German positions along the front. As with Totalize, many of the bombers mistakenly dropped their bombs short of their targets, causing 400 Polish and Canadian casualties. Covered by a smoke screen laid down by their artillery, two Canadian divisions moved forwards. Although their line of sight was reduced, German units still managed to inflict severe casualties on the Canadian 4th Armoured Division, which included its armoured brigade commander Brigadier Leslie Booth, as the division moved south toward Falaise. Throughout the day, continual attacks by the Canadian 4th and Polish 1st armoured divisions managed to force a crossing of the Laison River. Limited access to the crossing points over the Dives River allowed counterattacks by the German 102nd SS Heavy Panzer Battalion. The town of Potigny fell to Polish forces in the late afternoon. By the end of the first day, elements of the Canadian 3rd and 4th divisions had reached Point 159, directly north of Falaise, although they had been unable to break into the town. To bolster his offensive, Simonds ordered the Canadian 2nd Infantry Division to move toward the front, with the hope that this reinforcement would be sufficient to enable his divisions to capture the town.

Although the first day's progress was slower than expected, Operation Tractable resumed on 15 August; both armoured divisions pushed southeast toward Falaise. The Canadian 2nd and 3rd infantry divisions—with the support of the Canadian 2nd Armoured Brigade—continued their drive south towards the town. After harsh fighting, the 4th Armoured Division captured Soulangy but the gains made were minimal as strong German resistance prevented a breakthrough to Trun. On 16 August, the Canadian 2nd Infantry Division broke into Falaise, encountering minor opposition from Waffen-SS units and scattered pockets of German infantry. Although it would take two more days to clear all resistance in the town, the first major objective of Operation Tractable had been achieved. Simonds began to reorganize the bulk of his armoured forces for a renewed push towards Trun to close the Falaise Pocket.

=== 16–19 August ===
==== Drives for Trun and Chambois ====
The drive for Trun by Polish and Canadian armoured divisions began on 16 August, with preliminary attacks in preparation for an assault against Trun and Chambois. On 17 August, both armoured divisions of the Canadian 1st Army advanced. By early afternoon, the Polish 1st Armoured Division had outflanked the 12th SS Panzer Division, enabling several Polish formations to both reach the 4th Armoured Division's objectives and significantly expand the bridgehead northwest of Trun. Stanisław Maczek—the Polish divisional commander—split his forces into three battlegroups each of an armoured regiment and an infantry battalion. (Note: Jarymowycz gives four battlegroups but this figure is unsupported by other sources.) One of these struck southwest, cutting off Trun and establishing itself on the high ground dominating the town and the Dives river valley, allowing for a powerful assault by the Canadian 4th Armoured Division on Trun. The town was liberated on the morning of 18 August.

As Canadian and Polish forces liberated Trun, Maczek's second armoured battlegroup manoeuvred southeast, capturing Champeaux and anchoring future attacks against Chambois across a 10 km (6 mi) front. At its closest, the front was 6 km (4 mi) from forces of the US V Corps in the town. By the evening of 18 August, all of Maczek's battlegroups had established themselves directly north of Chambois (one outside of the town, one near Vimoutiers and one at the foot of Hill 262). (Note: Jarymowycz states two.) With reinforcements quickly arriving from the 4th Canadian Armoured Division, Maczek was in an ideal position to close the gap the following day. The presence of the Polish Armoured Division also alerted Generalfeldmarshall Walther Model of the need to keep the pocket open.

==== Closing the gap ====
Early on 19 August, Simonds met with his divisional commanders to plan the closing of the gap. The 4th Canadian Armoured Division would attack toward Chambois, on the western flank of two battlegroups of the 1st Polish Armoured Division. Two additional Polish battlegroups would strike eastward, securing Hill 262 to cover the eastern flanks of the assault. The 2nd and 3rd Canadian infantry divisions would continue their grinding attacks against the northern extremities of the Falaise Pocket, inflicting heavy casualties on the exhausted remains of the 12th SS Panzer Division. The assault began almost immediately after the meeting, with one battlegroup of the 1st Polish Armoured Division advancing toward Chambois and "Currie Task Force" of the 4th Armoured Division covering their advance. Simultaneously, two Polish battlegroups moved for Hill 262. Despite determined German resistance, Battlegroup Zgorzelski was able to secure Point 137, directly west of Hill 262. By early afternoon, Battlegroup Stefanowicz had captured the hill, annihilating a German infantry company in the process. Polish casualties accounted for nearly 50 per cent of those sustained by the 1st Canadian Army.

By late afternoon of 19 August, Canadian and Polish forces had linked with the US 80th US Division and 90th US Division already in the town. The Falaise Gap had been closed, trapping Model's forces. As the link occurred, the II SS Panzer Corps had begun its counterattack against Polish forces on Hill 262, to reopen the pocket.

=== 20 August ===
==== St. Lambert-sur-Dives and Hill 117 ====
German counterattacks against Canadian-Polish positions on 20 August 20, 1944

On the morning of 20 August, the 2nd SS Division Das Reich and the 9th SS Panzer Division Hohenstaufen, attacked Polish positions on Hill 262. At the same time, the 16th Infantry Division and the 12th SS Panzer Division attacked American and Canadian forces from within the pocket, opening small channels through Allied positions. By mid-morning, 2,000 survivors of the German 2nd Parachute Division had managed to breach Canadian positions along the Dives River and at Point 117. Around noon, several units of the 10th SS Panzer Division Frundsberg, 12th SS Panzer Division and the 116th Panzer Division managed to break through these weakened positions.

By mid-afternoon, reinforcements from an armoured battlegroup formed from the South Alberta Regiment and the Argyll and Sutherland Highlanders of Canada under Major David Vivian Currie managed to reach St. Lambert-sur-Dives. Over the next 36 hours, the battlegroup repulsed almost continual attacks by German forces, destroying seven German tanks, twelve 88 mm (3.46 in) anti-tank guns and forty vehicles. Currie's battlegroup was able to inflict nearly 2,000 casualties on the German forces, including 300 killed and 1,100 captured. By the evening of 20 August, the Germans had exhausted their attack against St. Lambert-sur-Dives; the surviving members of the LXXXIV Corps (General Otto Elfeldt) surrendered to Canadian and American forces near Chambois. For his actions at St. Lambert-sur-Dives, Currie was awarded the Victoria Cross, the only Canadian so honoured for service in the Normandy Campaign.

==== Hill 262 (Mont Ormel) ====
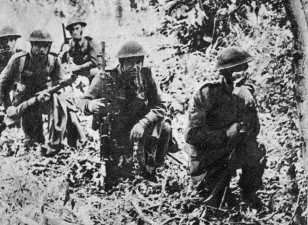
Polish infantry moving towards cover on Mont Ormel, 20 August 1944

While Currie's force stalled German forces outside of St. Lambert, two battlegroups of Maczek's Polish 1st Armoured Division were engaged in a protracted battle with two well-trained SS Panzer divisions. Throughout the night of the 19th, Polish forces had entrenched themselves along the south, southwest and northeastern lines of approach to Hill 262. Directly southwest of Mont Ormel, German units moved along the road as the Poles inflicted heavy casualties on German forces moving towards Mont Ormel with a well-coordinated artillery barrage. The Polish infantry and armour were supported by the guns of the 58th Battery, 4th Medium Regiment, 2nd Canadian Army Group Royal Artillery (AGRA) and assisted by the artillery observer, Pierre Sévigny. Sévigny's assistance was crucial in defending Hill 262 and he later received the Virtuti Militari (Poland's highest military decoration) for his exertions during the battle.

From the northeast, the 2nd SS Panzer Division planned an attack against the four infantry battalions and two armoured regiments of the 1st Polish Armoured Division dug in on Hill 262. The 9th SS Panzer Division would attack from the north, while simultaneously preventing Canadian units from reinforcing the Poles. Having managed to break out of the Falaise Pocket, the 10th SS, 12th SS and 116th Panzer divisions would then attack Hill 262 from the southwest. If this obstacle could be cleared, German units could begin withdrawing from the Falaise Pocket.

The first attack against Polish positions was by the "Der Führer Regiment" of the 2nd SS Panzer Division. The Podhale Rifles battalion was able to repel the attack but used much of its ammunition in doing so. The second attack was devastating to the dwindling armoured forces of the Polish battlegroups. A German tank, positioned on Point 239 (northeast of Mont Ormel), was able to destroy five Sherman tanks within two minutes. The 3rd Parachute Division—along with an armoured regiment of the 1st SS Panzer Division—attacked Mont Ormel from inside the Falaise Pocket. This attack was repulsed by the artillery, which "massacred" German infantry and armour closing in on their positions.

As the assault from the southwest ran out of momentum, the 2nd SS Panzer Division resumed its attack on the northeast of the ridge. Since Polish units were now concentrated on the southern edges of the position, the 2nd SS Panzer Division was able to force a path through to the 3rd Parachute Division by noon, opening a gap in the pocket. By mid-afternoon, close to 10,000 German troops had escaped through the corridor. Despite being overwhelmed by counterattacks, Polish forces continued to hold the high ground on Mont Ormel, which they referred to as the "Mace" (Maczuga), inflicting many casualties on the German forces escaping through the gap by artillery fire. Generaloberst Paul Hausser, commander of the 7th Army, ordered the positions to be "eliminated". Substantial forces, including the 352nd Infantry Division and several battlegroups from the 2nd SS Panzer Division inflicted many casualties on the 8th and 9th battalions of the 1st Polish Armoured Division, the counterattack was defeated. The battle cost the Poles most of their ammunition, leaving them in a precarious position.

At 19:00 on 20 August, a 20-minute ceasefire was arranged to allow German forces to evacuate a large convoy of medical vehicles. Immediately following the passage of the vehicles, the fighting resumed and intensified. The Germans were incapable of dislodging the Polish forces, the defenders had reached the point of exhaustion. With little ammunition left, the Poles were forced to watch as the remnants of the XLVII Panzer Corps escaped from the pocket. Despite this, Polish artillery continued to bombard every German unit that entered the evacuation corridor. Stefanowicz—commander of the Polish battlegroups on Hill 262—said,

Gentlemen. Everything is lost. I do not believe [the] Canadians will manage to help us. We have only 110 men left, with 50 rounds per gun and 5 rounds per tank ... Fight to the end! To surrender to the SS is senseless, you know it well. Gentlemen! Good luck—tonight, we will die for Poland and civilization. We will fight to the last platoon, to the last tank, then to the last man.

=== 21 August ===
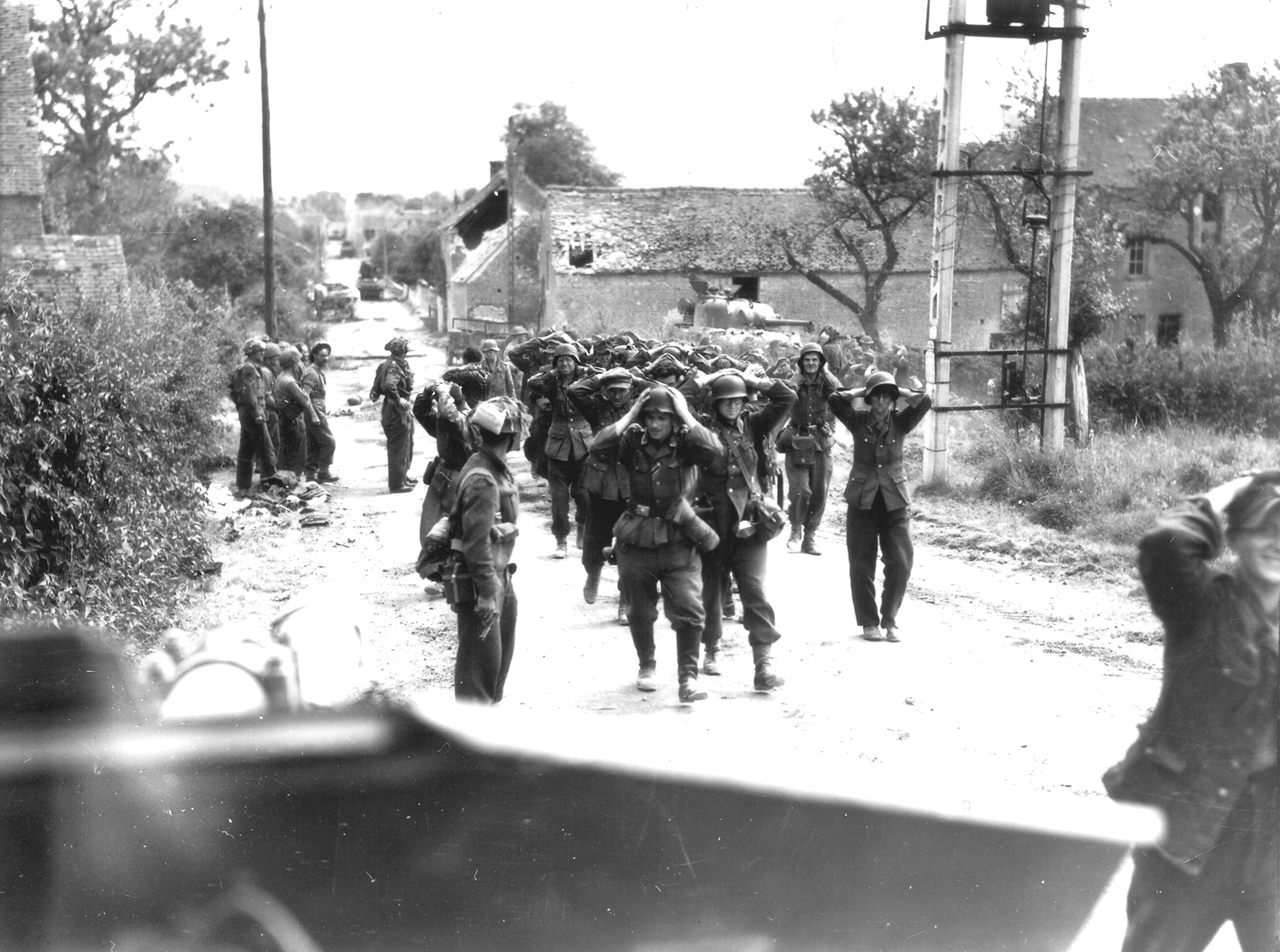
German forces surrendering in St. Lambert-sur-Dives on 21 August 1944

Night was welcomed by the German and Polish forces surrounding Mont Ormel. Fighting was sporadic, as both sides avoided contact with one another. Frequent Polish artillery barrages interrupted German attempts to retreat from the sector. In the morning, German attacks on the position resumed. Although not as well-coordinated as on the day before, the attack managed to reach the last of the Polish defenders on Mont Ormel. As the remaining Polish forces repelled the assault, their tanks used the last of their ammunition.

At approximately 12:00, the SS remnants launched a final assault on the positions of the 9th Battalion and were defeated at point-blank range. The two battlegroups of the 1st Polish Armoured Division had survived the onslaught, despite being surrounded by German forces for three days. Reynolds and McGilvray place the Polish losses on the Maczuga at 351 killed and wounded and 11 tanks lost and Jarymowycz gives 325 killed, 1,002 wounded and 114 missing, approximately 20 percent of the division's combat strength. Within an hour, the Canadian Grenadier Guards managed to link up with the last of Stefanowicz's men. By late afternoon, the remains of the 2nd SS Panzer Division and the 9th SS Panzer Division had begun their retreat to the Seine River. The Falaise Gap had been closed, with a large number of German forces still trapped inside.

== Aftermath ==
=== Analysis ===
By the evening of 21 August 1944, most of the German forces in the Falaise Pocket had surrendered. Nearly all of the German formations that had caused significant damage to the Canadians throughout the Normandy campaign had been destroyed. The Panzer Lehr Division and the 9th SS Panzer Division existed in name only. The 12th SS Panzer Division had lost 94 percent of its armour, nearly all of its field-guns and 70 percent of its vehicles. Several German units, notably the 2nd SS Panzer Division and the 12th SS Panzer Division had managed to escape east toward the Seine River, less most of their motorized equipment. Conservative estimates for the number of German soldiers captured in the Falaise Pocket approach 50,000, although some estimates put total German losses in the pocket as high as 200,000. By 23 August, the remainder of the 7th Army had entrenched itself along the Seine River to defend Paris. Simultaneously, elements of Army Group G including the 15th Army and the 5th Panzer Army moved to engage American forces in the south. In the following week, elements of the First Canadian Army attacked the Germans on the Seine to break through to the Channel Ports. On the evening of 23 August, French and American troops entered Paris.

=== Casualties ===
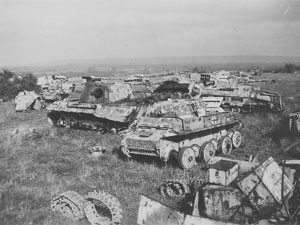
German equipment destroyed near Mont Ormel

Due to the successive offensives of early August, exact Canadian casualties for Tractable are not known. Losses during Totalize and Tractable are put at 5,500 men. German casualties during Operation Tractable are also uncertain; approximate figures can be found for casualties within the Falaise Pocket but not for the Canadian operations during Tractable. After the Falaise Pocket, the German 7th Army was severely depleted, having lost from 50,000 to 200,000 men, over 200 tanks, 1,000 guns and 5,000 other vehicles. In the fighting around Hill 262, the Germans lost 2,000 men killed, 5,000 taken prisoner, 55 tanks, 152 other armoured vehicles and 44 guns. Polish casualties for Operation Tractable (until 22 August) are 1,441 men, of whom 325 were killed (including 21 officers), 1,002 wounded (35 officers) and 114 missing, which includes 263 men lost before the Chambois and Ormel actions from 14 to 18 August.

=== Battle honours ===
In the British and Commonwealth system of battle honours, participation in Operation Tractable (included as part of the honour Falaise for service from 7 to 22 August) was recognized in 1957, 1958 and 1959 by the award of the battle honours Laison (or "The Laison" for Canadian units) for service from 14 to 17 August, Chambois from 18 to 22 August and St Lambert-sur-Dives from 19 to 22 August.
