= Battle of Chambois =

1944 World War II battle near Chambois

- Part of Operation Overlord, Second World War
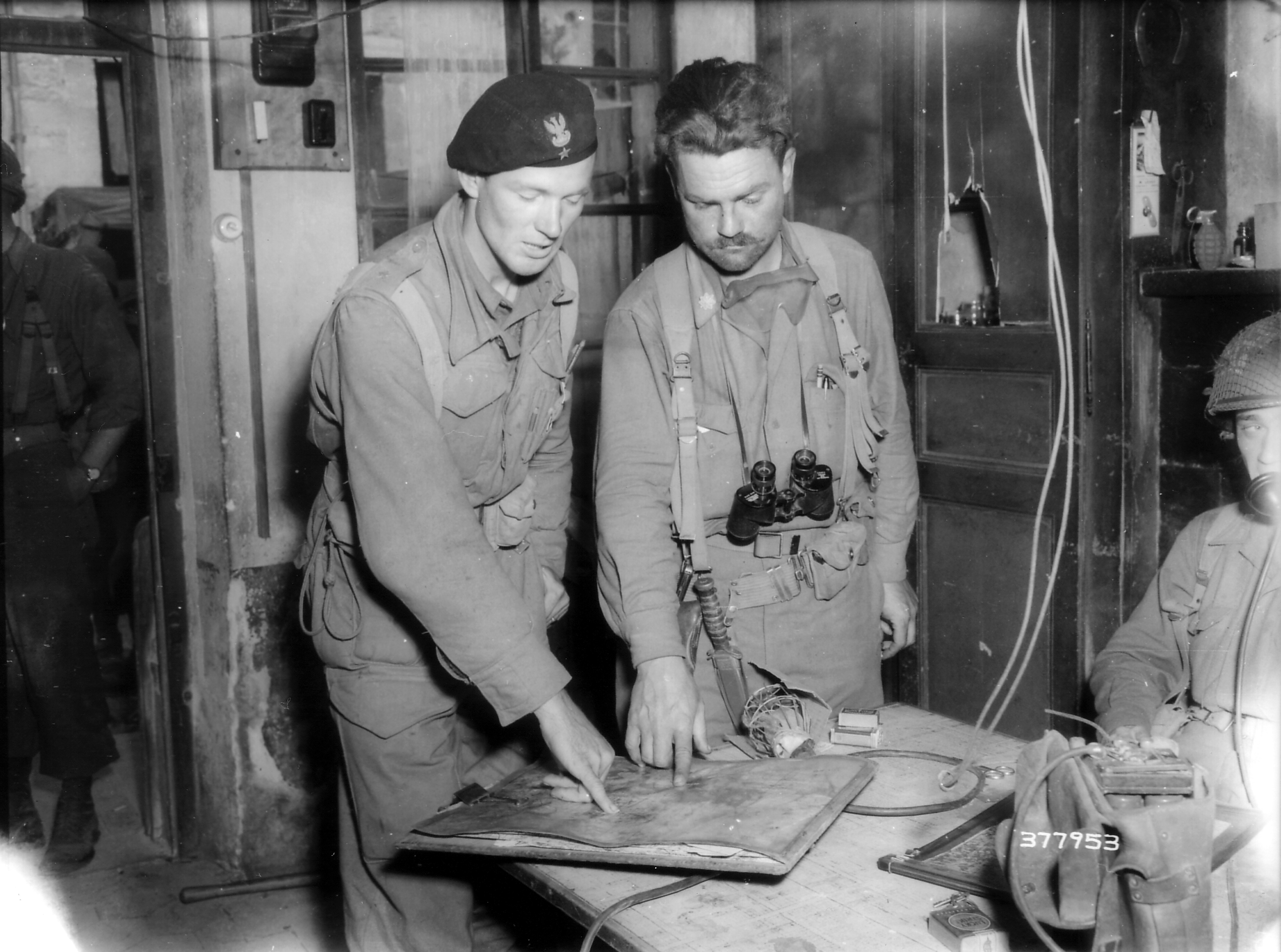
- US and Polish officers after the junction of the US and Polish forces at Chambois
Date	18–20 August 1944
Location	Chambois, France 48°48′21″N 00°06′22″E
Result	Allied victory

Belligerents
United States; Canada; Poland	Germany

Commanders and leaders
(United States) George S. Patton; (Canada) Harry Crerar; (Poland) Stanisław Maczek	(Nazi Germany) Walter Model; (Nazi Germany) Paul Hausser (WIA)

Units involved
90th Infantry Division (US); 1st Armoured Division (Pol)	116th Panzer Division; 7th Army

The Battle of Chambois was an August 1944 battle during the Battle of Normandy in World War II. Prior to the battle, a pocket had formed around Falaise, Calvados, where the German Army Group B, with the 7th Army and the Fifth Panzer Army (formerly Panzergruppe West) were encircled by the Western Allies. The seizure of Chambois by American, Canadian and Polish forces saw the final closure of the Falaise Pocket on August 21, 1944, and the destruction of most of Army Group B.

== Background ==
Allied and German positions around the Falaise–Argentan area in the aftermath of Operation Tractable, 17 August 1944. The German 7th Army and elements of 5th Panzer Army face encirclement.

Following the success of Operation Totalize south of Caen on August 8 and 9, General Harry Crerar, commander of the First Canadian Army, pushed south. Operation Tractable was launched to break through the German lines and capture the tactically important towns of Falaise and then the smaller towns of Trun and Chambois and to encircle large German formations.

On August 18, 1944, Canadian forces captured Trun, while General Stanisław Maczek's Polish 1st Armoured Division headed towards Chambois to encircle 110,000 Germans in the Falaise pocket. Small corridors east of Chambois allowed small numbers of Germans to escape the pocket and head towards the river Seine.

To the south of Chambois, the American 90th Infantry Division pushed north to close the pocket at Chambois. On the morning of August 19 Saint-Lambert-sur-Dives was taken by Canadian forces, and at midday Polish forces attacked towards Chambois and against German positions on what was known as Hill 262, located north-east of Chambois. Polish forces then attacked the outskirts of Chambois. Chambois had been heavily shelled and was in ruins with German soldiers from various battered units flowing into the area.

To the east of Chambois, Polish and American forces linked up to finally close the Falaise pocket. The Allies continued to attack retreating elements of the German 5th and 7th armies and the 116th Panzer Division. A German counter-attack organised by General Paul Hausser on August 20 failed to break Polish lines but did allow further German troops to escape the pocket. German troops and vehicles were trapped on the congested narrow roads and were easy prey for Allied artillery and air attacks. Late on August 20, Chambois finally fell to Polish forces and the Falaise pocket was sealed on August 21 with approximately 50,000 Germans trapped inside.

== Aftermath ==
The battle resulted in the destruction of most of Army Group B west of the Seine, which opened the way to Paris and the Franco-German border for the Allied armies on the Western Front. Remnants of German units retreated east towards the Seine but left much of their heavy armour and artillery behind. General Hausser was wounded in the jaw during the battle but escaped the encirclement.

== Bibliography ==
- Willmott, H. P.; Cross, Robin; Messenger, Charles (2008). World War II. New York: Covent Garden Books. ISBN 978-0-756-64914-2.
- Lodieu, Didier (2003). Objectif Chambois!: secteur américain, 90th US Inf. Div [Objective Chambois!: American sector, 90th US Inf. Div]. Louviers: Ysec, coll. ISBN 978-2-846-73027-3.
