= Coudehard =

- Commune
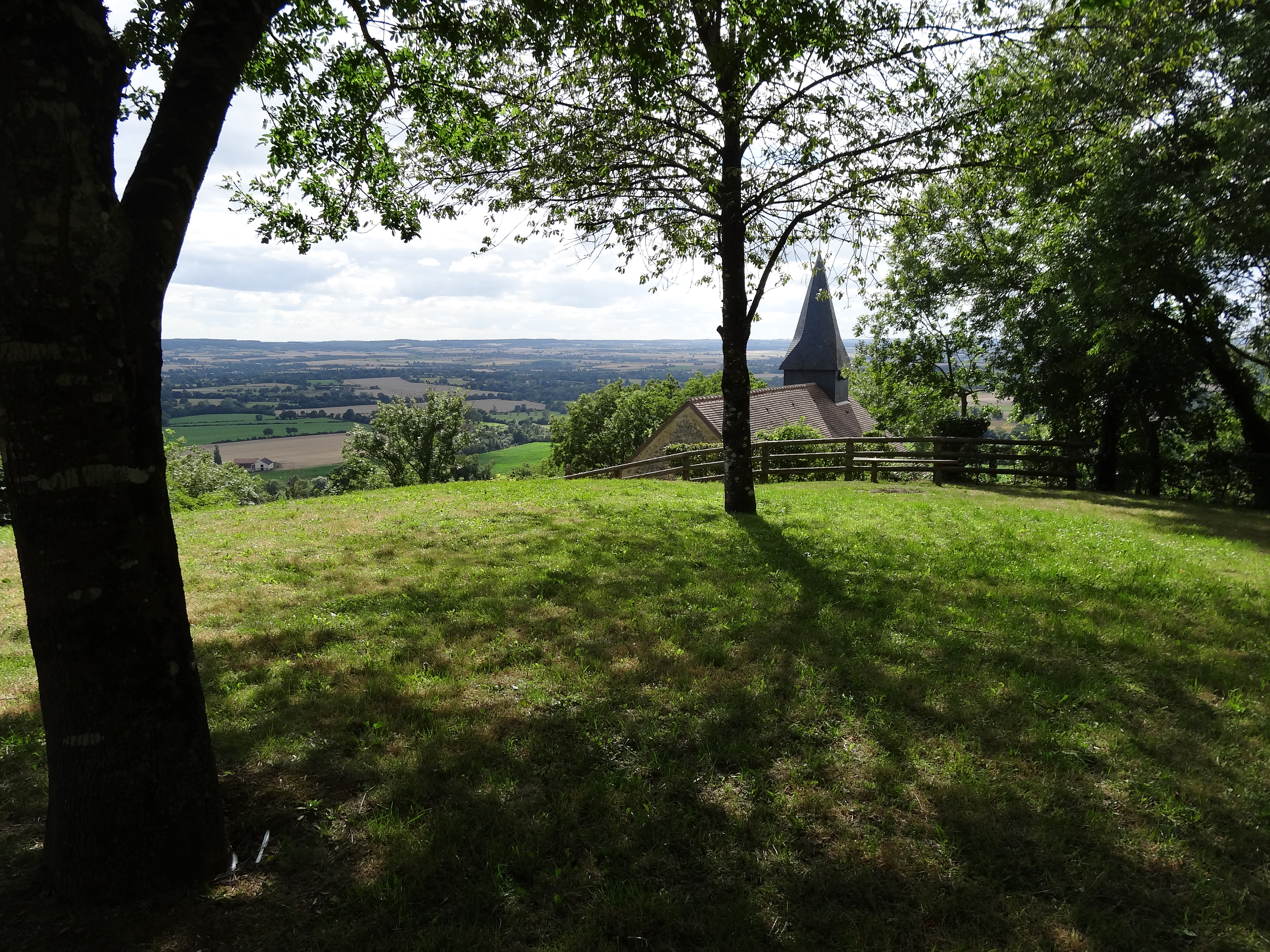
- The church in Coudehard
- Location of Coudehard
- Location within France Location within Normandy
- Coordinates: 48°50′39″N 0°08′08″E
- Country: France
- Region: Normandy
- Department: Orne
- Arrondissement: Argentan
- Canton: Argentan-2
- Intercommunality: Terres d'Argentan Interco

Government
  - Mayor (2020–2026): Alain Gosselin
- Area^{1}: 8.52 km^{2} (3.29 sq mi)
- Elevation: 25 m (82 ft)
- Highest elevation: 265 m (869 ft)
- Lowest elevation: 112 m (367 ft)
- Population (2023): 77
  - Density: 9.0/km^{2} (23/sq mi)
- Time zone: UTC+01:00 (CET)
  - Summer (DST): UTC+02:00 (CEST)
- INSEE/Postal code: 61120 /61160
- ^{1} French Land Register data, which excludes lakes, ponds, glaciers > 1 km^{2} (0.386 sq mi or 247 acres) and river estuaries.

Coudehard (French pronunciation: [kud(ə)aʁ]) is a commune in the Orne department in north-western France.

== Geography ==
The commune is made up of the following collection of villages and hamlets, La Cour du Bosq and Coudehard.

The commune has the following streams running through its borders, the Secqueville, the Besion, the Foulbec, the Mont-Ormel and the Costillets.

== Points of Interest ==
Hill 262 is an area of high ground above the commune that is a site of a bloody engagement in the final stages of the Battle of Falaise as part of Operation Overlord during the Second World War. This is where a single Polish regiment, the 1st Armoured Division, held back the German forces for 3 days on their own to close the Falaise pocket, before being relieved by the Canadian Grenadier Guards. The Mémorial de Coudehard–Montormel museum, in the neighbouring commune of Mont-Ormel was constructed on the same site on the battle's 50th anniversary in 1994.

== See also ==
- Communes of the Orne department
