= Hill 262 =

Location critical to closure of the Falaise pocket

Battle of Hill 262
- Part of Operation Tractable
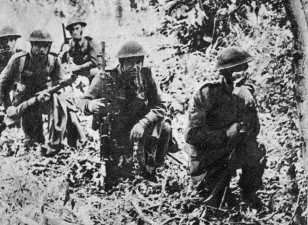
- Polish infantry moving towards cover on Mount Ormel, 20 August 1944.
Date	19–21 August 1944
Location	Mont Ormel, northeast of Chambois 48.8378°N 0.1428°E
Result	Polish victory

Belligerents
Poland	Germany

Commanders and leaders
(Poland) Stanisław Maczek	(Germany) Walter Model

Strength
1,500 infantry ~80 tanks	Remnants of around 20 infantry and Panzer divisions (Note: Among others these included the 1st SS, 2nd SS, 9th SS, 10th SS, 12th SS, 2nd and 116th Panzer Divisions, and the 3rd Parachute, 84th, 276th, 277th, 326th, 353rd and 363rd Infantry Divisions.)

Casualties and losses
351 casualties 11 tanks	~1,500 casualties (Note: According to McGilvray, around 500 dead and 1,000 captured.)

Hill 262, or the Mont Ormel ridge (elevation 262 m (860 ft)), is an area of high ground above the village of Coudehard in Normandy that was the location of a bloody engagement in the final stages of the Battle of Falaise in the Normandy Campaign during the Second World War. By late summer 1944, the bulk of two German armies had become surrounded by the Allies near the town of Falaise. The Mont Ormel ridge, with its commanding view of the area, sat astride the only escape route still open to the Germans. Polish forces seized the northern height of the ridge on 19 August and held it until noon on 21 August, despite determined attempts by German units to overrun the position, contributing greatly to the Allied victory.

The success of Operation Cobra provided the Allies with an opportunity to cut off and destroy most German forces west of the River Seine. American, British and Canadian armies converged on the area around Falaise, trapping the German 7th Army and elements of the 5th Panzer Army in what became known as the Falaise pocket. On 20 August Generalfeldmarschall Walter Model ordered a withdrawal but by this time the Allies were already blocking his path. During the night of 19 August, two battle groups of the Polish 1st Armoured Division (Major-General Stanisław Maczek) had established themselves in the mouth of the Falaise pocket on and around the northernmost of the two peaks of Mont Ormel ridge.

On 20 August, with his forces encircled, Model organised attacks on the Polish position from both sides of the pocket. The Germans managed to isolate the ridge and force open a narrow corridor. Lacking the fighting power to close the corridor, the Poles directed constant and accurate artillery fire on German units retreating from the pocket, causing heavy casualties. The Germans launched fierce attacks throughout 20 August which inflicted losses on the Poles on Hill 262. Exhausted and dangerously low on ammunition, the Poles managed to retain their foothold on the ridge. The following day, less intense attacks continued until midday when the last German effort to overrun the position was defeated at close quarters. The Poles were relieved by the Canadian Grenadier Guards shortly after noon; their stand had ensured the closure of the Falaise pocket and the collapse of the German position in Normandy.

== Background ==
Allied and German positions around the Falaise–Argentan area in the aftermath of Operation Tractable, 17 August 1944. The German 7th Army and elements of 5th Panzer Army face encirclement.

On 25 July 1944, Lieutenant General Omar Bradley launched Operation Cobra. Although intended only to cut a corridor through to Brittany to emerge from the bocage, the offensive caused a collapse of the German position opposite the American sector when Generalfeldmarschall Günther von Kluge's Army Group B was slow to withdraw and expended many of its remaining effective formations in the Operation Lüttich counter-offensive. With the German left flank in ruins the Americans began a headlong advance into Brittany but a large concentration of German forces—including most of their armoured strength—remained opposite the British and Canadian sector. The Allied ground forces commander General Bernard Montgomery ordered the Third U.S. Army (General George Patton) to swing north towards the town of Falaise. Its capture would cut off virtually all the remaining German forces in Normandy.

While the Americans pressed in from the south and the British Second Army from the west, the task of completing the encirclement fell to the newly operational First Canadian Army (General Harry Crerar). Crerar and Lieutenant-General Guy Simonds, commander of the II Canadian Corps, planned an Anglo-Canadian offensive, Operation Totalize. Intended to seize an area of high ground north of Falaise, by 9 August the offensive was in trouble despite initial gains on Verrières Ridge and near Cintheaux. Strong German defences and indecision and hesitation in the Canadian chain of command hampered Allied efforts and the 4th Canadian and 1st Polish Armoured Divisions suffered many casualties. Anglo-Canadian forces reached Hill 195 north of Falaise on 10 August but were unable to make further progress and Totalize was terminated.

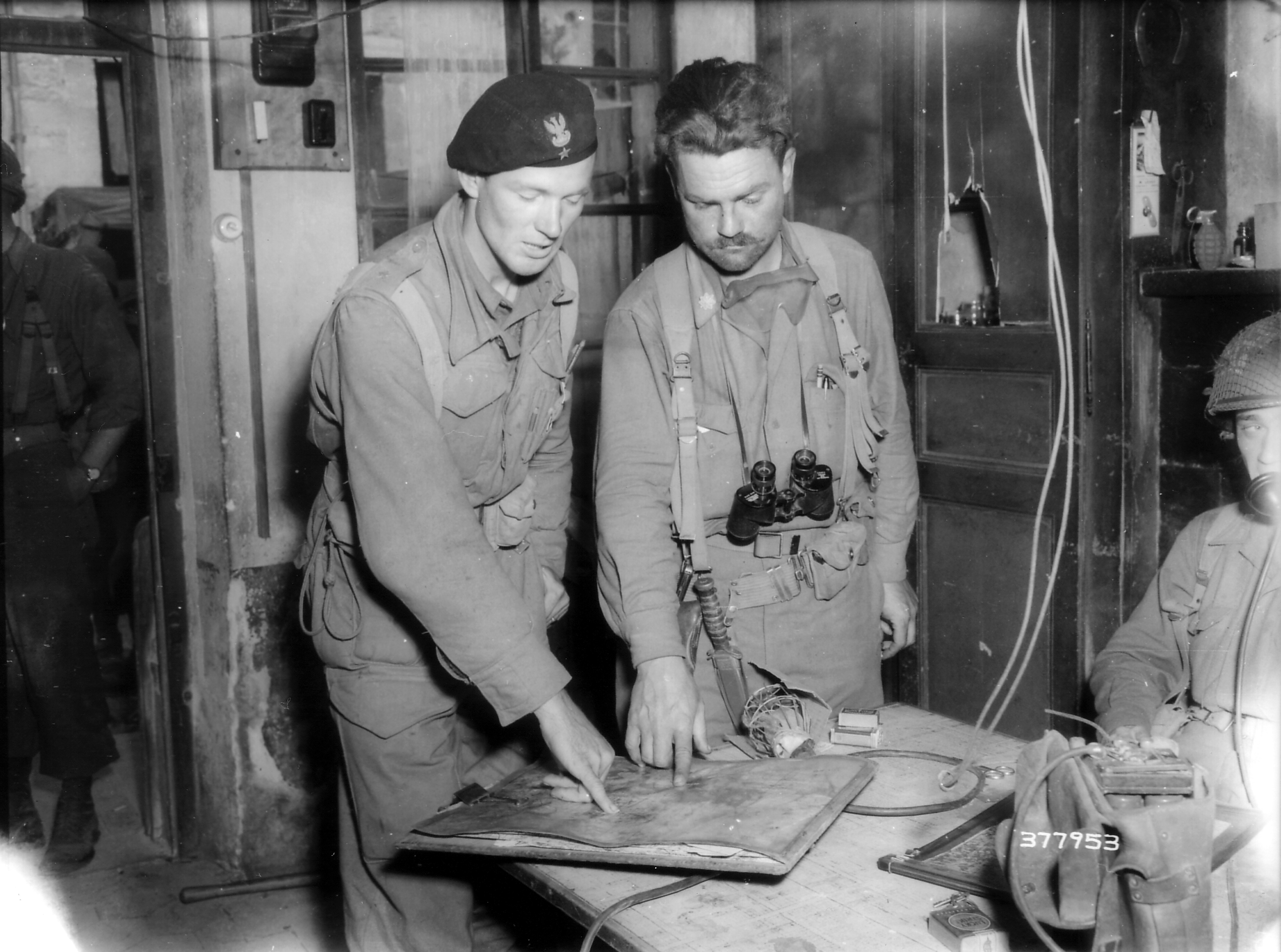
Lieutenant Kłaptocz of the Polish 1st Armoured Division and Major Leonard Dull of the US 90th Infantry Division, in Chambois, August 1944, after the Allied link-up.

The Canadians reorganised and on 14 August began Operation Tractable; three days later Falaise fell. In a meeting with his divisional commanders on 19 August, Simonds emphasised the importance of quickly closing the Falaise Pocket to General Stanisław Maczek. Assigned responsibility for the Moissy–Chambois–Coudehard area, the 1st Polish Armoured Division had split into three battlegroups of an armoured regiment and an infantry battalion each and were sweeping the countryside north of Chambois. (Note: Jarymowycz gives four battlegroups, but this figure is unsupported by other sources.) Facing determined German resistance and with Koszutski's battlegroup having "gone astray" and needing to be rescued, the division had not yet taken Chambois, Coudehard, or the Mont Ormel ridge. (Note: This battlegroup ended up "deep in the German rear" at Champeaux instead of Chambois as a result of a misunderstanding with its French civilian guide, who "disappeared at the first opportunity". The error proved serendipitous when the 2nd Armoured Regiment discovered that Champeaux housed the headquarters of the 2nd SS Panzer Division. Along with prisoners and loot, the Poles seized orders detailing German defensive measures for I and II SS Panzer Corps.) Galvanised by Simonds, Maczek was determined to get his men onto their objectives as soon as possible. The 10th Dragoons (10th Polish Motorised infantry Battalion) and 10th Polish Mounted Rifle Regiment (the divisional armoured reconnaissance regiment) drove hard on Chambois, the capture of which would effect a link with the U.S. 90th Infantry Division which was attacking simultaneously the town from the south. Having taken Trun and Champeaux the 4th Canadian Armoured Division was able to assist and by the evening of 19 August the town was in Allied hands. (Note: The Poles and Americans claimed the capture of Chambois; Stacey writes "The impression one receives is that of Poles and Americans arriving in Chambois from opposite directions at about the same moment, though the Americans may have been in greater strength".)

Although the pocket had been closed, the Allies were not yet astride the escape route of the 7th Army in any great strength and their positions came under frenzied assault. During the day an armoured column from the 2nd Panzer Division broke through the Canadians in St Lambert, capturing half the village and maintaining an open road for six hours until being forced out. Many Germans escaped along this route and numerous small parties infiltrated on foot through to the River Dives during the night.

== Mont Ormel ridge ==
Northeast of Chambois and overlooking the Dives River valley, an elongated, wooded ridge runs roughly north–south above the village of Coudehard. The ridge's two highest peaks—Points 262 North (262N) and 262 South (262S)—lie either side of a pass within which the hamlet of Mont Ormel, from which the ridge takes its name, is situated. (Note: Reynolds implies that only Point 262N is referred to as Mont Ormel, although other sources give this name to the entire ridge.) One of the few westbound roads in the area runs from Chambois through the pass, heading towards Vimoutiers and the River Seine. Historian Michael Reynolds describes Point 262N as offering "spectacular views over much of the Falaise Pocket". Viewing the feature on an Allied map, Maczek commented that it resembled a caveman's club with two bulbous heads; the Poles nicknamed it the Maczuga, Polish for "mace". The ridge, known to the Allies as Hill 262, formed a crucial blocking position for sealing the Falaise Pocket and preventing any outside attempts to relieve the German 7th Army.

=== 19 August ===
19 August 1944. While elements of the Canadian 4th Armoured Division drive on St. Lambert, the Polish 1st Armoured Division has split into three battlegroups. One makes for Chambois to link up with the American 90th Infantry Division attacking from the south while the other two race to establish blocking positions in the mouth of the Falaise Pocket around Coudehard and the Mont Ormel ridge.

Shortly after noon on 19 August, Battlegroup Zgorzelski (the 1st Armoured Regiment, 9th Infantry Battalion, and a company of anti-tank guns) made a thrust towards Coudehard and the Mont Ormel ridge. While part of the battlegroup remained in Coudehard, two companies of the Polish Highland (Podhalan) Battalion led the assault up the north peak, followed by the squadrons of the 1st Armoured Regiment (Lieutenant-Colonel Aleksander Stefanowicz) who picked their way up a narrow, winding track. The Poles reached the summit at approximately 12:40 and took captive a number of demoralised Germans before proceeding to shell a 2 mi (3.2 km)-long column of Panther tanks, armoured cars, 88 mm and 105 mm guns, Nebelwerfer, trucks and many horse-drawn carts. Three companies of the Polish 1st Armoured Regiment opened fire from every machine gun and gun. The lead vehicles were quickly destroyed and the Panthers, because of bad positioning, could not hit the Shermans at the top of the hill (the shells were passing just above the turrets of the Shermans). Because of the destruction of the equipment and the few POWs taken, the Poles called the remnants of the column that approached them through the pass along the Chambois–Vimoutiers road: Psie Pole (Dog's Field). The victory was hard-won over a period of a few hours; the Germans, despite being "shocked" to discover that Point 262N was in Polish hands, quickly responded with a bombardment from Nebelwerfer and anti-tank guns. The Poles counter-attacked and more Germans, including wounded, were taken prisoner. The prisoners were moved to a hunting lodge (the Zameczek) on the northern slope. Point 137, near Coudehard, fell just after 15:30, yielding further captives. (Note: This group of captives was handed over to the Americans in Chambois.)

At around 17:00, Battlegroup Koszutski, consisting of the 2nd Armoured Regiment and the 8th Infantry Battalion, arrived at the ridge, followed by the rest of the Polish Highland Battalion and elements of the 9th Infantry Battalion at 19:30. The remainder of the 9th Infantry Battalion and the anti-tank company had remained around Boisjos 2 km (1.2 mi) north of Coudehard but the bulk of two battlegroups, about 80 tanks, 20 anti-tank guns, and around 1,500 infantry was concentrated on and around Point 262N. The Poles did not occupy Point 262S. Although Lieutenant-Colonel Zdzisław Szydłowski, commanding the 9th Infantry Battalion, was given orders to take the southern peak. With darkness falling and thick smoke from the burning German column in the pass obscuring the battlefield, this was deemed too hazardous to attempt before next light. The Poles spent the night fortifying Point 262N and entrenching the southern, southwestern and northeastern approaches to their positions.

=== 20 August ===
20 August 1944. The Poles on Hill 262N and the Canadians in St Lambert positioned to intercept the eastward movement of German forces from the Falaise Pocket and exact a heavy toll on passing units. Supported by attacks from outside the pocket, the Germans fail to dislodge the Poles from their position on the ridge.

Of the approximately 20 German infantry and armoured divisions trapped in the Falaise pocket around twelve were still battleworthy. (Note: McGilvray identifies these as the 3rd Parachute, 84th, 276th, 277th, 326th, 353rd and 363rd Infantry Divisions and the 2nd, 116th, 1st SS, 10th SS and 12th SS Panzer Divisions.) As these formations retreated eastwards they fought desperately to keep the jaws of the encirclement—formed by the Canadians in Trun and St. Lambert and the Poles and Americans in Chambois—from closing. German movement out of the pocket on the night of 19/20 August cut off the Polish battle groups on the Mont Ormel ridge. On discovering this Stefanowicz conferred with Koszutski. Lacking the means to seal the pocket or fight their way out, they decided that they could only hold fast until relieved.

Although the Poles on Point 262N could hear movement from the valley, other than some mortar rounds that landed among the positions of the 8th Infantry Battalion, the night passed uneventfully. Without possession of Point 262S the Poles were unable to interfere with the large numbers of German troops slipping past the southern slopes of the ridge. The uneven, wooded terrain, interspersed with thick hedgerows, made control of the ground to the west and south-west difficult by day and impossible by night. As it grew light on 20 August Szydłowsky organised two companies of the 9th Infantry Battalion, supported by the 1st Armoured Regiment, for an attack across the road towards Point 262S. Hampered by the wreckage littering the pass, the attack soon bogged down.

The Poles' possession of around 2 square kilometres (0.77 sq mi) of commanding terrain overlooking the only route out of Normandy for the 7th Army was a serious impediment to the German retreat. Field Marshal Walther Model, who on succeeding von Kluge two days earlier had authorised a general withdrawal, was well aware of the need to remove the "cork" from the bottle containing the 7th Army. He ordered elements of the 2nd SS Panzer Division Das Reich and the 9th SS Panzer Division Hohenstaufen—located outside the pocket—to attack Hill 262. At 09:00 the 8th Infantry Battalion's positions around the Zameczek (Polish: small castle) to the north and northeast of point 262N were assaulted, and it was not until 10:30 that the Germans were driven back. In the heavy fighting a number of the 1st Armoured Regiment's supply lorries were destroyed.

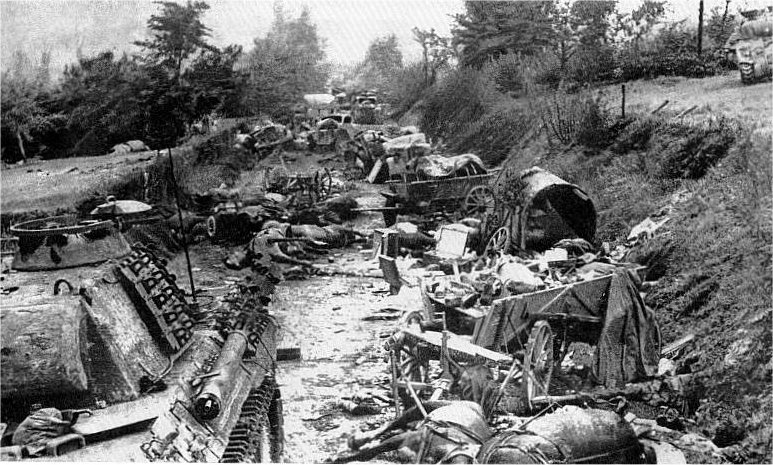
The remains of a retreating German column destroyed by the 1st Armoured Regiment near Hill 262

From within the pocket, German formations seeking an escape route were filtering through gaps in the Allied lines between Trun and Chambois, (Note: According to Reynolds a shallow stretch of the Dives between Magny and Moissy, approximately 5 kilometres (3.1 mi) long, was still passable. Although under indirect artillery fire the river could be waded in this area.) heading towards the ridge from the west. The Poles could see the road from Chambois choked with troops and vehicles attempting to pass along the Dives valley. A number of columns moving down from the northeast that included tanks and self-propelled artillery were subjected to an hour-long bombardment from the 1st Armoured Regiment's 3rd Squadron, breaking them up and scattering their infantry.

Having spotted German tank movements towards a nearby height, Point 239 (roughly 3 kilometres (1.9 mi) north of the ridge), an attack was planned to take this feature and provide a buffer for the Poles' northern positions around the Zameczek. However, the 2nd Armoured Regiment's 2nd Squadron, tasked with capturing Point 239, was unable to release its tanks from their defensive duties. At one point during the day (Note: The times given for this are variously: after 09:00 (Reynolds (2002)); 11:00 (McGilvray); and after 15:00 (Reynolds (2001)). McGilvray also credits a 75mm or 88mm anti-tank gun, rather than a Panther tank. However, the sources agree that five Shermans were destroyed from the direction of Point 239.) a Panther tank of the 2nd SS Panzer Division worked its way onto the height and, at a range of 1,400 metres (1,500 yd), picked off five Shermans of the 1st Armoured Regiment's 3rd Squadron. The survivors were forced to change position although they later lost another tank to fire from the north.

Around midday, the Germans opened up an artillery and mortar barrage that caused casualties among the ridge's defenders and lasted for the entire afternoon. At about the same time, Kampfgruppe Weidinger seized an important road junction northeast of Coudehard. Several units of the 10th SS, 12th SS, and 116th Panzer Divisions managed to clear a corridor past Point 262N, and by mid afternoon about 10,000 German troops had passed out of the pocket.

A battalion of the 3rd Parachute Division, along with an armoured regiment of the 1st SS Panzer Division, now joined the assault on the ridge. At 14:00 the 8th Infantry Battalion on the ridge's northern slopes once more came under attack. Although the infantry and armour closing in on the Polish positions were eventually repulsed, with a large number of prisoners being taken and artillery again causing significant casualties, the Poles were being gradually pushed back. However, they managed to retain their grip on Point 262N and with well-coordinated artillery fire continued to exact a toll on German units traversing the corridor. Another attempt was made to organise an attack towards Point 239 but the Germans were ready and the 9th Infantry Battalion's 3rd Company was driven back with heavy losses.

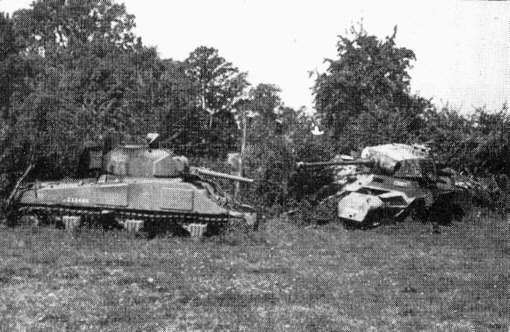
The remains of a Polish Sherman tank and two German vehicles (a Panther and an Sd.Kfz. 251 halftrack), destroyed in the vicinity of Boisjois near Point 262N

Exasperated by the casualties to his men, 7th Army commander Oberstgruppenführer Paul Hausser ordered the Polish positions to be "eliminated". At 15:00, substantial forces, including remnants of the 352nd Infantry Division and several battle groups from the 2nd SS Panzer Division, inflicted heavy casualties on the 8th and 9th Infantry Battalions. By 17:00 the attack was at its height and the Poles were contending with German tanks and infantry inside their perimeter. Grenadiers of the 2nd SS Panzer Division very nearly reached the ridge's summit before being repulsed by the well dug in Polish defenders. The integrity of the position was not restored until 19:00, by which time the Poles had expended almost all their ammunition leaving themselves in a precarious situation. A 20-minute ceasefire was arranged to allow the Germans to evacuate a large medical convoy, after which fighting resumed with redoubled intensity.

Earlier in the day, Simonds had ordered his troops to "make every effort" to reach the Poles isolated on Hill 262, but at "sacrificial" cost the remnants of the 9th SS Panzer and 3rd Parachute Divisions had succeeded in preventing the Canadians from intervening. Dangerously low on supplies and unable to evacuate their prisoners or the wounded of both sides—many of whom received further injuries from the unremitting hail of mortar bombs—the Poles had hoped to see the Canadian 4th Armoured Division coming to their rescue by evening. However, as night fell it became clear that no Allied relief force would reach the ridge that day. Lacking the means to interfere, the exhausted Poles were forced to watch as the remnants of the XLVII Panzer Corps left the pocket. Fighting died down and was sporadic throughout the hours of darkness; after the brutality of the day's combat both sides avoided contact although frequent Polish artillery strikes continued to harass German forces retreating from the sector. Stefanowicz, himself wounded during the day's fighting, struck a fatalistic note as he addressed his four remaining officers:

Gentlemen, all is lost. I do not think that the Canadians can come to our rescue. We have only about 110 able-bodied men left. Five shells per gun and 50 bullets per man. That's very little, but fight all the same. Surrender to the S.S. is futile; you know that. I thank you. You have fought well. Good luck, gentlemen. Tonight we shall die for Poland and for civilization! . . . each tank will fight independently, and eventually each man for himself."

=== 21 August ===
21 August 1944. Exhausted and dangerously low on ammunition, the Poles on Hill 262N are finally relieved after midday by the lead elements of the Canadian 4th Armoured Division, who have fought hard to reach the ridge. By evening the Falaise Pocket is sealed.

The next morning, despite poor flying weather, an effort was made to air-drop ammunition to the Polish force on the ridge. Learning that the Canadians had resumed their push and were making for Point 239, at 07:00 a platoon of the 1st Armoured Regiment's 3rd Squadron reconnoitered the German positions below the Zameczek. Further German attacks were launched during the morning, both from inside the pocket along the Chambois–Vimoutiers road, and from the east. Raids from the direction of Coudehard managed to penetrate the Polish defences and take captives. The final German effort came at around 11:00—SS remnants had infiltrated through the wooded hills to the rear of the 1st Armoured Regiment's dressing station. This "suicidal" assault was defeated at point-blank range by the 9th Infantry Battalion with the 1st Armoured Regiment's tanks using their anti-aircraft machine guns in support. The machine guns' tracer ammunition set fire to the grass, killing wounded men on the slope. As the final infantry assaults melted away, the German artillery and mortar fire targeting the hill subsided as well.

Moving up from Chambois, the Polish 1st Armoured Division's reconnaissance regiment made an attempt to reach their comrades on Point 262N but was mistakenly fired upon by the ridge's defenders. The regiment withdrew after losing two Cromwell tanks. At 12:00 a Polish forward patrol from the ridge encountered the Canadian vanguard near Point 239. The Canadian Grenadier Guards reached the ridge just over an hour later, having fought for more than five hours and accounted for two Panthers, a Panzer IV, and two self-propelled guns along their route. By 14:00, with the arrival of the first supply convoy, the position was relieved.

== Aftermath ==
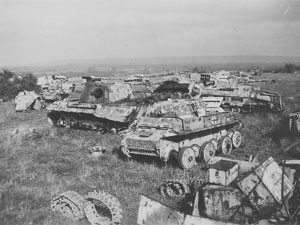
German equipment destroyed near Mont Ormel

The Falaise pocket was considered closed by the evening of 21 August. Tanks of the Canadian 4th Armoured Division had linked up with the Polish forces in Coudehard, and the Canadian 3rd and 4th Infantry Divisions had fully secured St. Lambert and the northern passage to Chambois. Both Reynolds and McGilvray place the Polish losses on the Maczuga (Polish: bludgeon/club/cudgel) at 351 killed and wounded and 11 tanks lost, although Jarymowycz gives higher figures of 325 killed, 1,002 wounded, and 114 missing—approximately 20% of the division's combat strength. For the entire operation to close the Falaise pocket, Copp quotes from the 1st Polish Armoured Division's operational report, citing 1,441 casualties including 466 killed in action. McGilvray estimates the German losses in their assaults on the ridge as around 500 dead with a further 1,000 taken prisoner, most of these from the 12th SS Panzer Division. He also records "scores" of Tiger, Panther and Panzer IV tanks destroyed, as well as a significant quantity of artillery pieces.

Although some estimates state that up to 100,000 German troops, many of them wounded, may have succeeded in escaping the Allied encirclement, they left behind 40,000-50,000 prisoners and over 10,000 dead. According to military historian Gregor Dallas: "The Poles had closed the Falaise Pocket. The Poles had opened the gate to Paris." Simonds stated that he had "never seen such wholesale havoc in his life" and Canadian engineers erected a sign on Point 262N's summit reading simply "A Polish Battlefield".

In 1965 on the battle's 20th anniversary, a monument to the Polish, Canadian, American and French units that took part in the battle was erected on Hill 262. Marking the occasion, former President of the United States Dwight D. Eisenhower commented that "no other battlefield presented such a horrible sight of death, hell, and total destruction." The Mémorial de Coudehard–Montormel museum was constructed on the same site on the battle's 50th anniversary in 1994.

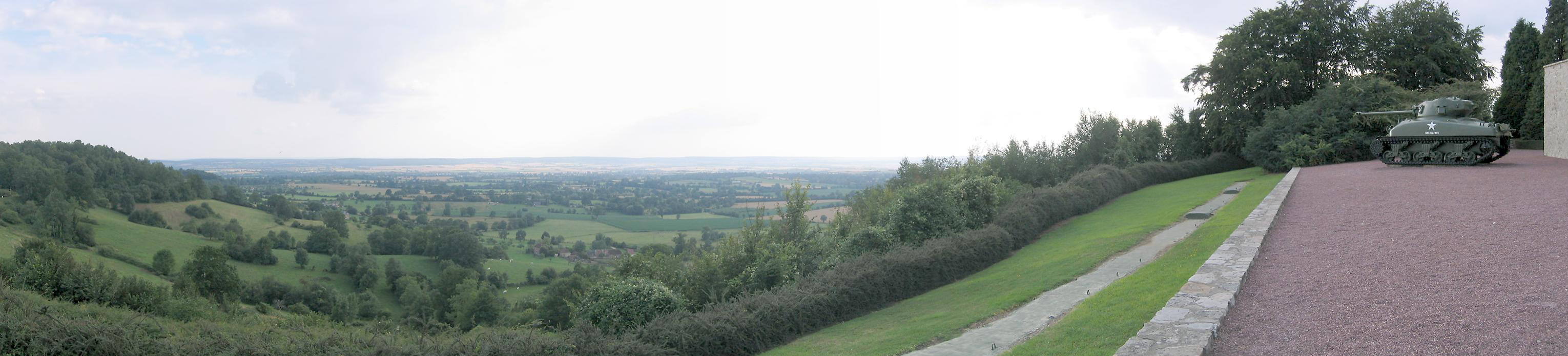
View from the Mont Ormel ridge overlooking the Dives River valley towards Trun and Chambois—in August 1944, the site of the Falaise pocket. The Mémorial de Coudehard–Montormel (right) stands on Point 262N.

== Popular culture ==
The 2006 video game Call of Duty 3, features a campaign following Polish armored troops, including the holding of Hill 262 in the level “The Mace.”

== See also ==
- Battle for Hill 140

== Notes ==
Footnotes

Citations
