= Coudehard-Montormel Memorial =

Museum in France

Coordinates: 48°50′15″N 0°08′32″E

The Coudehard-Montormel Memorial (mémorial de Coudehard-Montormel or mémorial de Montormel) is a historical museum in Mont-Ormel in France, dedicated to the battle of the Falaise pocket, the last episode in the Battle of Normandy. It is sited on the summit of Hill 262, where the pocket was officially closed on 21 August 1944, with two sites – an open-air monument at the hill's summit (overlooking the vallée de la Dives and the plain where the last phases of the battle played out), which was inaugurated in 1965 on the battle's twentieth anniversary, and the museum itself, in the side of the hill, opened in 1994 on the battle's fiftieth anniversary.

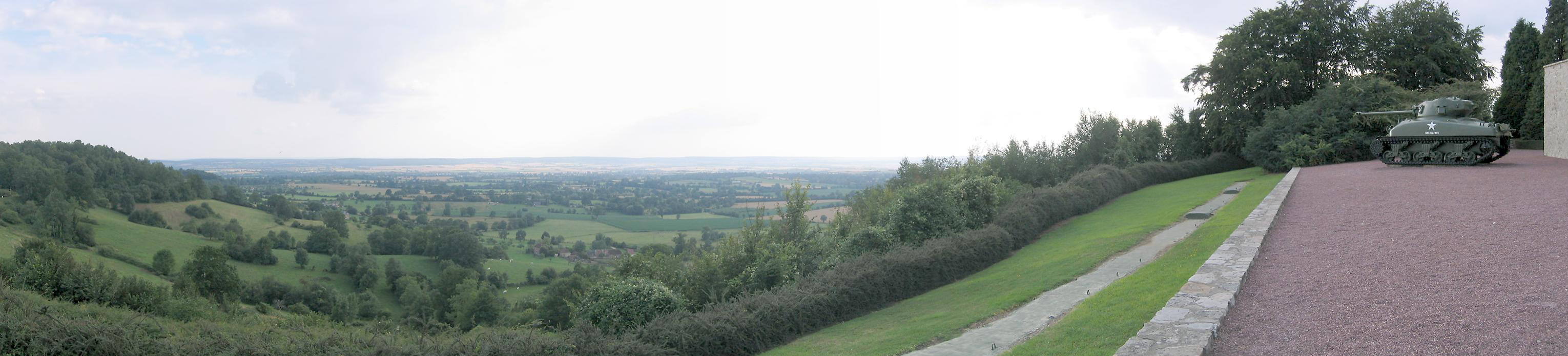
View from the Mont Ormel ridge overlooking the Dives River valley towards Trun and Chambois—in August 1944, the site of the Falaise pocket. The Mémorial de Coudehard–Montormel (right) stands on Point 262N.
