= Saint-Lambert-sur-Dive =

- Commune
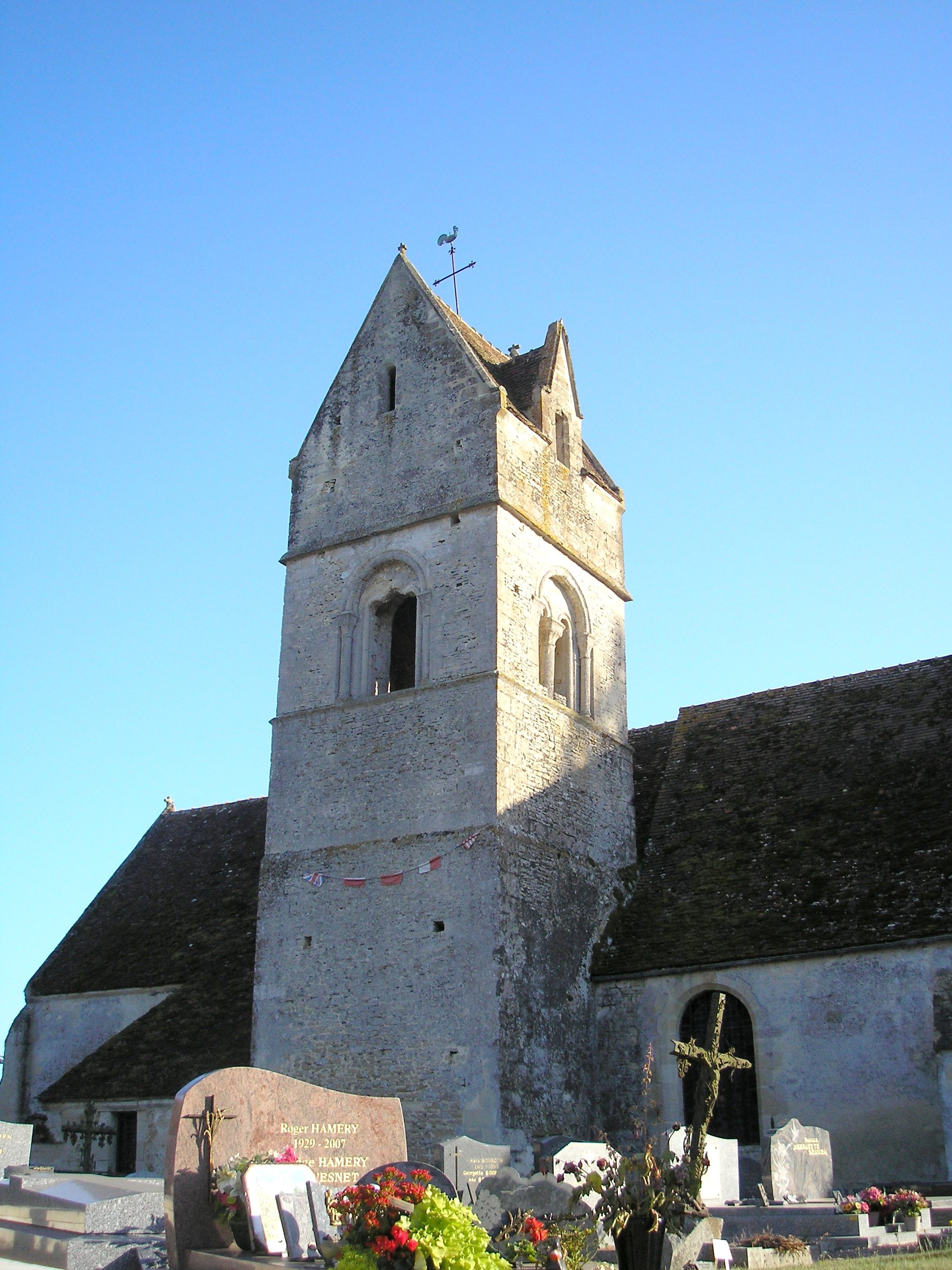
- The church in Saint-Lambert-sur-Dive
- Location of Saint-Lambert-sur-Dive
- Location within France Location within Normandy
- Coordinates: 48°49′15″N 0°04′33″E
- Country: France
- Region: Normandy
- Department: Orne
- Arrondissement: Argentan
- Canton: Argentan-2
- Intercommunality: Terres d'Argentan Interco

Government
  - Mayor (2020–2026): Jean-Philippe Ballot
- Area^{1}: 7.73 km^{2} (2.98 sq mi)
- Elevation: 92 m (302 ft)
- Highest elevation: 148 m (486 ft)
- Lowest elevation: 85 m (279 ft)
- Population (2023): 134
  - Density: 17.3/km^{2} (44.9/sq mi)
- Time zone: UTC+01:00 (CET)
  - Summer (DST): UTC+02:00 (CEST)
- INSEE/Postal code: 61413 /61160
- ^{1} French Land Register data, which excludes lakes, ponds, glaciers > 1 km^{2} (0.386 sq mi or 247 acres) and river estuaries.

Saint-Lambert-sur-Dive (French pronunciation: [sɛ̃ lɑ̃bɛʁ syʁ div], literally Saint-Lambert on Dive) is a commune in the Orne department in north-western France.

== Significance ==
Saint-Lambert-sur-Dive is recognised as the place where the 4th Canadian Armoured Division (specifically the South Alberta Regiment and Argyll & Sutherland Highlanders of Canada) fought tenaciously in the closing stages of the Battle of Normandy. It is the place where Major David Vivian Currie won his Victoria Cross. The action centred on the stone bridge across the Dives and later, down to the ford at Moissy, both of which provided the Germans with escape routes across the river.

The commune has a memorial called the Belvédère des Canadiens or Canadian lookout which overlooks the key area of the battlefield and explains the history of the battle.

== Geography ==
The commune has two water courses running through it, the River Dives and a stream, the Foulbec.

== History ==
=== World War II ===
The full name Saint-Lambert-sur-Dives recognises the river Dives that runs along the south edge of the village, location of the final battle of the Normandy campaign of 1944. While often referred to as the Battle of the Falaise Gap, Saint-Lambert was the last village in the narrowing gap between the Canadians and Polish forces advancing southwards from Falaise and Trun, and the American and Free French forces pushing northwards from Argentan and Chambois. The capture of Saint-Lambert would finally close the gap, and trap tens of thousands of German troops in the Falaise pocket.

On August 18, 1944, Major David Vivian Currie, commanding the Sherman tanks of C Squadron of the 29th Armoured Reconnaissance Regiment (The South Alberta Regiment), with attached infantry from "B" and "C" companies of the Argyll and Sutherland Highlanders of Canada and the Lincoln and Welland Regiment (all of the Canadian 4th Armoured Division), was ordered to move from Trun to capture and hold the village, and to attempt to link up with the American forces understood to be advancing towards the village from Chambois, less than two miles away. Events in and around St. Lambert over the next three days would eventually be recognized by the awarding of the Victoria Cross to Major Currie.

During the early hours of the action, four unarmed personnel from the Canadian Army Film and Photo Unit arrived in St. Lambert in two jeeps. They were able to record the events as they unfolded in black and white photographs (taken by photographer Lt. Donald I. Grant) and on cine film (taken by cameraman Sgt. Jack Stollery). The cine film captures the moment when Major Currie sees a German convoy coming towards the Canadian position, pulls his pistol and steps out to take the officer commanding the convoy by surprise, forcing him to surrender his troops. Lt. Grant's still photo captures the German officer in the seconds after his surrender, his arms still in the air, and also captures Sgt. Stollery at the far left of the photo, his cine camera clearly visible in his hands as he films the events as they unfolded. The series of black and white still photographs taken on August 19 by Lt. Grant are readily available through the Library and Archives of Canada. The original cine film was destroyed in a fire during the 1960s while under the care of the National Film Board of Canada. However, pieces of the original footage were picked up by newsreel companies and can be seen in several newsreels released shortly after the battle.

For an account of the battle of St. Lambert in August 1944, see here.

By August 21, the battle for St. Lambert was over. Within the village itself, some 300 Germans had been killed, 500 wounded and more than 2,100 taken prisoner. Seven tanks, including three along the main road through St. Lambert, twelve 88mm guns and 40 other vehicles were destroyed.

The area immediately south and west of St. Lambert was covered with German dead. Argyll soldier Arthur Bridge recalls a field on the southern edge of the village the size of a football pitch that could be walked across without touching the ground. General Eisenhower, who toured the area two days later, said in his memoirs: "It was literally possible to walk for hundreds of yards at a time, stepping on nothing but dead and decaying flesh."

By the end of the action, "B" and "C" companies had only 70 men left between them. They would be amalgamated on 22 August 1944 under the command of Major Alex Logie, son of Major General WA Logie who had been first Commanding Officer of the Argylls in 1903. Lieutenant General Guy Simonds, Commander of [II Canadian Corps], later came forward to inspect the town. He had to get out of his staff car and walk as the piles of wreckage made the road through the area impassable.

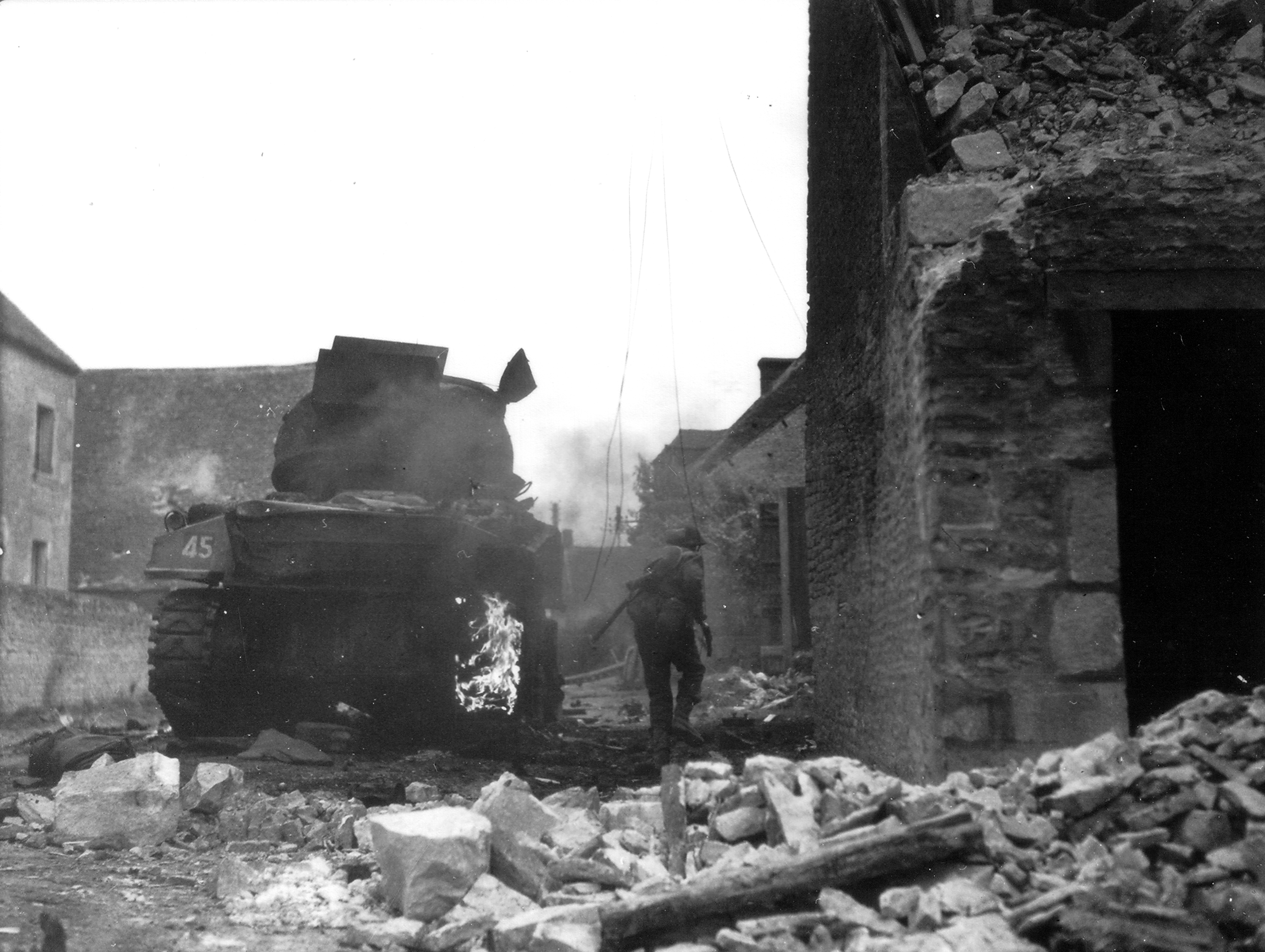
A member of the (A & S) Argyll & Sutherland Highlanders 4 Div. Run past a burning Canadian tank at St. Lambert on Dive

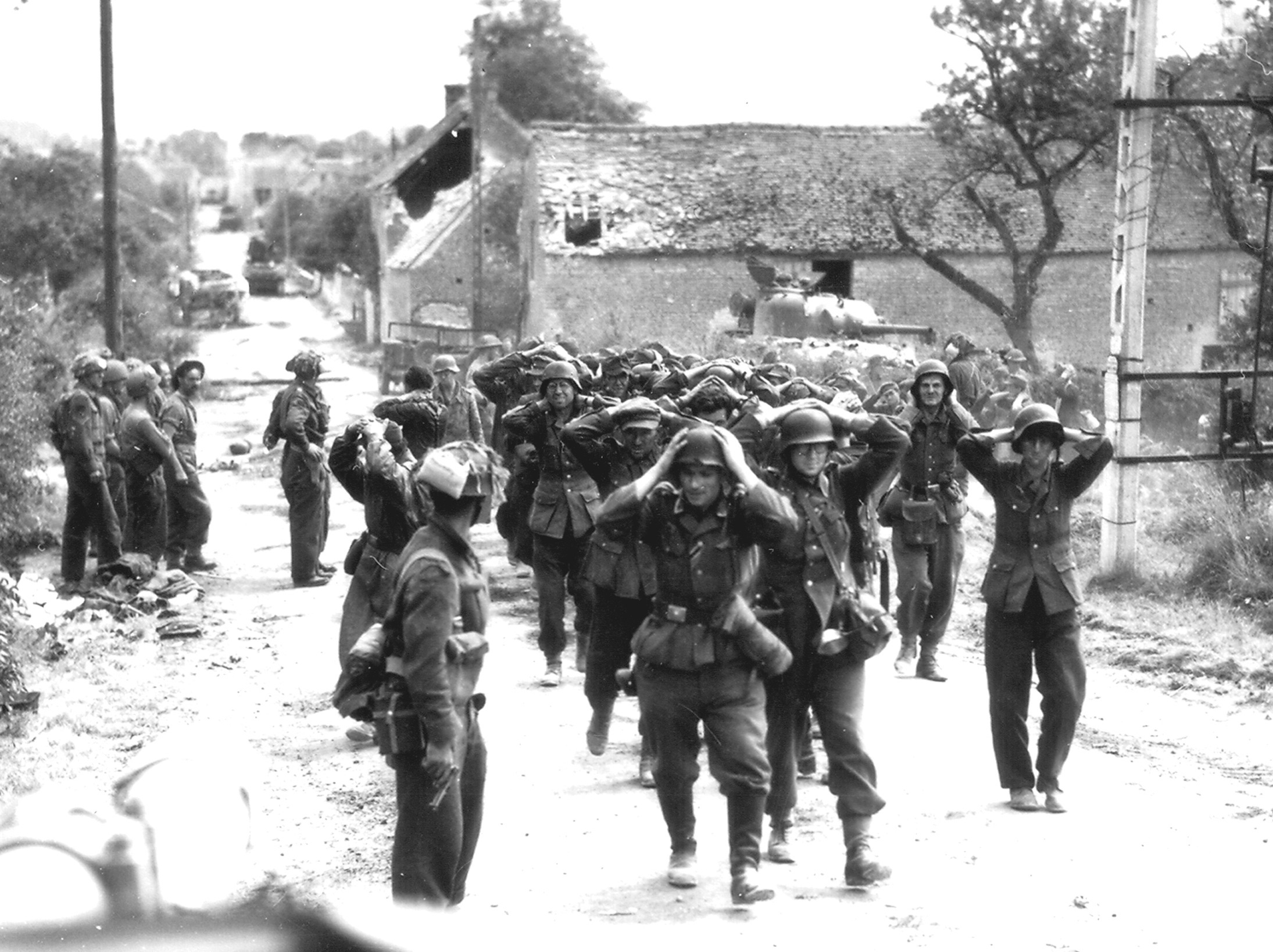
German forces surrendering at Saint-Lambert-sur-Dive

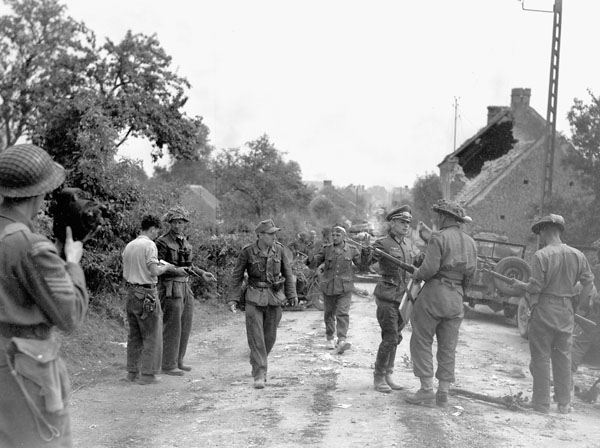
Major David V. Currie (left, with pistol in hand) of The South Alberta Regiment accepting the surrender of German troops at Saint-Lambert, on 19 August 1944

== Notable buildings and places ==
=== National heritage sites ===
- Saint-Lambert Church is a church built during the 12th century that was classed as a Monument historique in 1948.

== See also ==
- Communes of the Orne department
