= Chambois, Orne =

Chambois
- Part of Gouffern en Auge
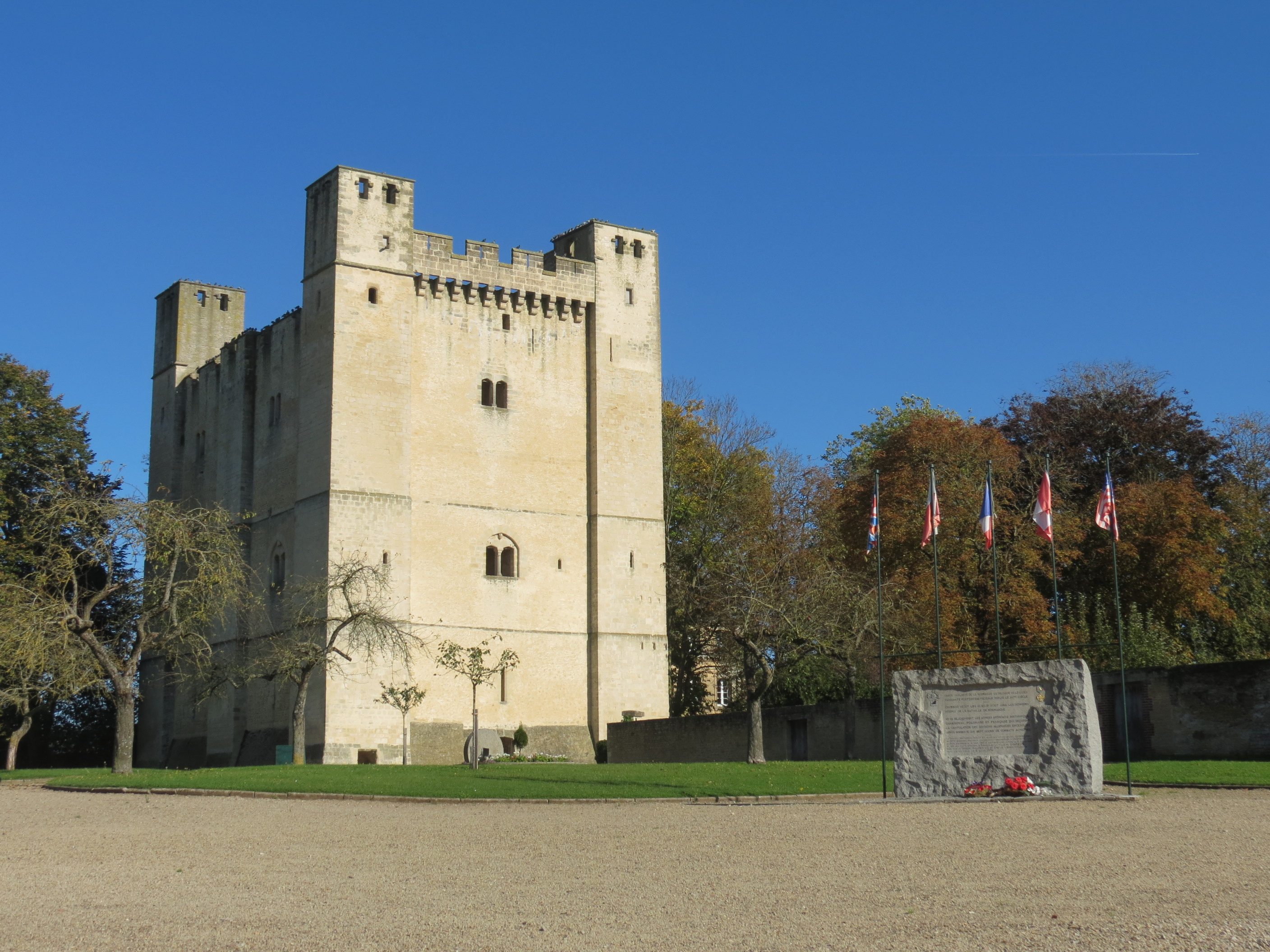
- 12th century donjon

- Coat of arms
- Location of Chambois
- Location within France Location within Normandy
- Coordinates: 48°48′21″N 0°06′22″E
- Country: France
- Region: Normandy
- Department: Orne
- Arrondissement: Argentan
- Canton: Argentan-2
- Commune: Gouffern en Auge
- Area^{1}: 8.3 km^{2} (3.2 sq mi)
- Elevation: 110 m (360 ft)
- Highest elevation: 156 m (512 ft)
- Lowest elevation: 89 m (292 ft)
- Population (2022): 380
  - Density: 46/km^{2} (120/sq mi)
- Time zone: UTC+01:00 (CET)
  - Summer (DST): UTC+02:00 (CEST)
- Postal code: 61160
- ^{1} French Land Register data, which excludes lakes, ponds, glaciers > 1 km^{2} (0.386 sq mi or 247 acres) and river estuaries.

Chambois (French pronunciation: [ʃɑ̃bwa]) is a former commune in the Orne département in north-western France. On 1 January 2017, it was merged into the new commune Gouffern en Auge. Its population was 380 in 2022. The town is remarkable for its 12th-century Norman keep and was involved in the closure of the Falaise pocket in 1944 during the Battle of Normandy.

== Norman keep ==
The Norman keep or Donjon was built in the 12th century. It is one of the rare surviving examples of a square keeps in Normandy.

== Closure of the Falaise Pocket ==
The Battle of Chambois was the scene of some of the bitterest fighting during the Normandy campaign. In August 1944, the Falaise pocket (or Falaise gap) was closed when Canadian, Polish (1st Armoured Division (Polish 1 Dywizja Pancerna)) and US (90th Infantry Division formations sealed off the gap on 19/20 August 1944.

For two days, Poles and Americans defended the town against continuous assaults launched by overwhelming enemy forces (mostly remnants of the German 7th Army), taking thousands of prisoners. The battle ultimately was ended as Allied air support finally destroyed what was left of the German forces.

The Coudehard-Montormel Memorial on the neighbouring Hill 262, details the history of the battle and closure of the Falaise pocket.

== See also ==
- Communes of the Orne department
