= Stanisław Maczek =

Polish general (1892–1994)

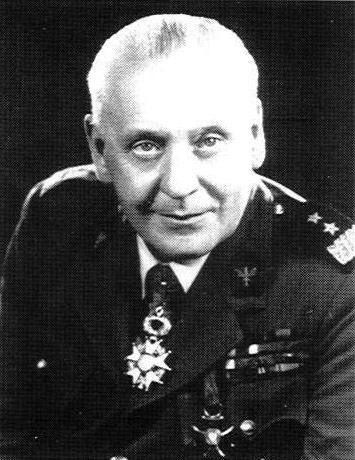
- After the war, still in the rank of Generał dywizji.
- Born: 31 March 1892; Szczerzec near Lwów, Kingdom of Galicia and Lodomeria, Austria-Hungary (now Shchyrets, Lviv Oblast, Ukraine)
- Died: 11 December 1994 (aged 102); Edinburgh, Scotland, United Kingdom
- Relatives: Vladko Maček (cousin)
- Military career
- Allegiance: Poland
- Service years: 1914–1947
- Rank: Lieutenant General
- Nickname: Baca
- Commands: 1st Armoured Division; 10th Armoured Cavalry Brigade; 10th Motorized Cavalry Brigade
- Conflicts: World War I; Italian Front; Polish–Ukrainian War Polish–Soviet War; Battle of Komarów; World War II; Invasion of Poland; Battle of Jordanów; Battle of Jarosław; Battle of Lwów; Battle of France; Invasion of Normandy; Falaise pocket; Operation Tractable; Battle of Hill 262; Battle of Chambois; Clearing the Channel Coast
- Awards: Order of the White Eagle; Knight's Cross of the Order of Virtuti Militari; Grand Cross of the Order of Polonia Restituta; Cross of Valour; Gold Cross of Merit with Swords; Full list
- Other work: barman

Lieutenant General Stanisław Władysław Maczek ([staˈɲiswav ˈmat͡ʂɛk]; 31 March 1892 – 11 December 1994) was a Polish tank commander of World War II, whose division was instrumental in the Allied liberation of France, closing the Falaise pocket, resulting in the destruction of 14 German Wehrmacht and SS divisions. A veteran of World War I, the Polish–Ukrainian and Polish–Soviet wars, Maczek was the commander of Poland's only major armoured formation during the September 1939 campaign, and later commanded a Polish armoured formation in France in 1940. He was the commander of the famous 1st Polish Armoured Division, and later of the I Polish Army Corps under Allied Command in 1942–45.

== Family ==
Stanisław Władysław Maczek was born on 31 March 1892 in the Lwów suburb of Szczerzec (now Ukrainian: Shchyrets), then in Austro-Hungarian Galicia. His father was a lawyer, who after retiring opened chambers in Drohobycz. His family might have been of distant Slovenian extraction; he was a cousin of the Slovenian Croatian (and Polish) politician Vladko Maček.

== Education ==
After graduating from the grammar school at Drohobycz in 1910, he attended the philosophy faculty of Lwów University where he studied Polish philology (i.e. language and literature). Among his tutors were the renowned Polish philologists Wilhelm Bruchnalski and Józef Kallenbach, He also attended lectures by Kazimierz Twardowski. During his studies he served in the Strzelec paramilitary organization, in which he received basic military training. After the outbreak of World War I, Maczek interrupted his studies, hoping to join Józef Piłsudski's Polish Legions, but instead was drafted into the Austro-Hungarian Army.

== World War I ==
After receiving a brief officer training, Maczek was sent to the Italian Front of World War I. Initially an NCO in the Tyrolean Regiment of the Imperial and Royal Army, he was promoted to second lieutenant in 1916 and then in 1918 to lieutenant. As the only Polish battalion commander in Austria-Hungary's Alpine regiments, Maczek gained experience in mountain warfare, which proved valuable in his later career.

== Poland's borders ==
On 11 November 1918, after receiving news of the Armistice, Maczek disbanded his battalion and returned to the newly reborn Poland. Three days later he arrived at Krosno, where he joined the Polish Army. Assigned the command of a Krosno battalion, Maczek began a limited offensive against the forces of the West Ukrainian People's Republic (ZUNR) with the aim of relieving his besieged hometown. However, due to insufficient support, after initial successes at Ustrzyki, Chyrów and Felsztyn, the Polish offensive got bogged down and the Polish–Ukrainian War turned into trench warfare for the rest of the winter.

In April 1919 Maczek was withdrawn from his unit and became the organizer and commander of the so-called 'flying' company (Polish: lotna kompania) as part of Gen. Aleksandrowicz's 4th Infantry Division. This unit, created on Maczek's initiative, was modelled after the German Sturmbataillone of World War I and was highly mobile, with horse-drawn vehicles (in the singular, taczanka, podwoda) from Austrian Army depots, and well-equipped with heavy machine guns. The unit was formed mostly from battle-hardened troops of the Krosno battalion, and its combat value was well above the average of the Polish Army of the time. Hence it served in a "firefighter" capacity, plugging holes that appeared in defensive lines, but also fighting with distinction in the Polish spring offensive. It took part in some of the heaviest fighting of the war, including the battles for Drohobycz, Stanisławów, Buczacz, and finally the ZUNR capital, Stryj.

After the end of the Polish–Ukrainian fighting, Maczek was confirmed in the rank of major with seniority from 1 June 1919. He was then attached to General Iwaszkiewicz's Polish 2nd Army as a staff officer. Bored with staff duties, Maczek repeatedly asked his superiors to give him command over a front-line unit. His wish was fulfilled only after the start of the Polish–Bolshevik War, when the 2nd Army suffered a defeat in initial clashes with Semyon Budyonny's 1st Cavalry Army. In Jarosław, Maczek formed a new 'flying' rifle battalion, mostly composed of fresh recruits and horseless uhlans. Despite insufficient training, the unit was moved to the front and Maczek again acted as a "firefighter", moving his unit quickly to wherever it was needed. His unit covered the retreat of the Polish forces at Mosty Wielkie, after which it was attached to Gen. Juliusz Rómmel's 1st Cavalry Division. It took part in the Polish assault on Waręż near Zamość, a tactical counter-assault on the rear of Budyonny's advancing Cossacks directly preceding the victorious battle of Komarów. After the end of hostilities, Maczek's battalion was officially named after him, although it was disbanded shortly after the signing of the treaty of Riga.

== Interwar years ==
Maczek decided not to resume his studies at Lwów University and remained in active service. Between 1921 and 1923 he commanded an infantry battalion within the Lwów-based 26th Infantry Regiment. On 1 August 1923 he was promoted to lieutenant colonel and sent to the Higher Military School in Warsaw. He graduated the following year and served until 1927 as head of Section II (intelligence) in Lwów. Later that year he moved to Grodno, where he became deputy commander of the 76th Infantry Regiment. In 1929, after finishing his training, he became commander of the Grodno-based 81st Infantry Regiment, holding that post until 1934. During that time, on 1 January 1931, he was promoted to colonel. In 1935 he was transferred to Częstochowa, where he became commander of infantry (practically, deputy commander of the whole division) in the 7th Infantry Division.

In October 1938 Maczek's experience as a commander of "flying" troops received recognition from his superiors, and he was given command of the Polish 10th Motorized Cavalry Brigade, the first fully motorized formation in the Polish Army.

== World War II ==
=== September 1939 ===
On the outbreak of war in September 1939, the 10th Motorized Cavalry Brigade was attached to the Kraków Army defending Lesser Poland and Silesia. Equipped with only light tanks and tankettes and with only one artillery battery of just eight heavy cannons, the brigade went into battle on the first day of war. After the Battle of Jordanów, Maczek's unit faced the entire German XVIII Corps of Gen. Eugen Beyer and successfully shielded the southern flank of the Polish forces, along the Beskids. Supported by only a few battalions of Border Guards and National Defence troops, Maczek's motorized brigade faced two Panzer divisions (4th Light Division under von Hubicki and 2nd Panzer Division under Veiel), as well as the 3rd Mountain Division under Eduard Dietl.

For five days Maczek's brigade fought bravely and efficiently, slowing the pace of the German Blitzkrieg to a bloody crawl: despite numerical and technical superiority, the Germans were unable to make more than 10 kilometres headway per day. Maczek's men took maximum advantage of the mountainous terrain, halting many German attacks and occasionally counter-attacking. However, after the front of the Kraków Army was broken to the north of the brigade's position, Maczek's formation was pulled out of the front line.

The brigade then fought as a screening unit, defending the bridges and fords in Lesser Poland, until it arrived at Lwów and joined the city's defences. It formed a mobile reserve during the battle for Lwów, allowing other Polish units to withdraw towards the Romanian Bridgehead. However, the plan was made obsolete by the invasion of Poland by the Soviet Union on 17 September. After two days, Marshal of Poland Edward Rydz-Śmigły ordered the brigade to cross the Hungarian border. Maczek's brigade was interned in Hungary. Although the unit had lost about half of its men, it had not been defeated in open combat, and therefore gained respect even from the enemy. It is considered to be the only Polish unit not to have lost a single battle in 1939. Maczek was not only esteemed by his superiors but also loved by his soldiers, who referred to him as Baca, a traditional Polish highlanders' name for a shepherd.

=== France, 1940 ===
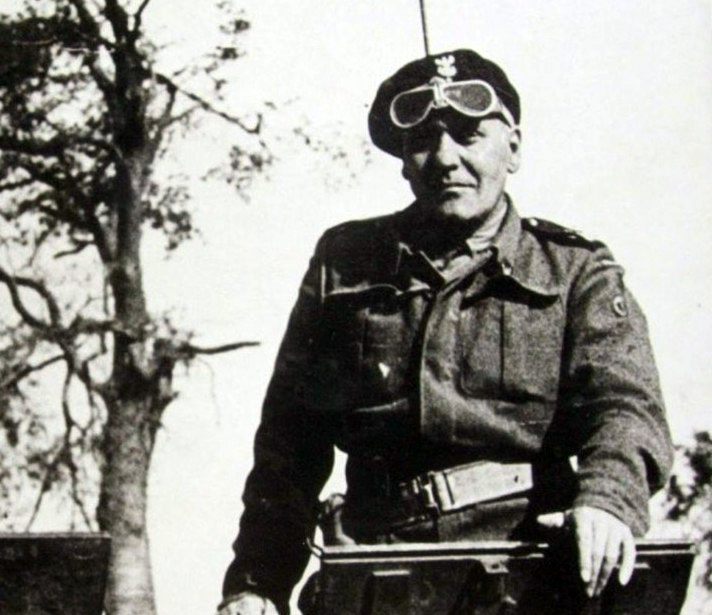
Stanisław Maczek, 1944

After the end of the September campaign Maczek made it to France, where he joined the re-created Polish Army and was promoted to the rank of brigadier-general. He was made the commanding officer of the Polish military camp in Coëtquidan. He then prepared a detailed report on the workings of German Blitzkrieg tactics, and possible precautions against it. This report was, however, completely disregarded by the French general staff (the Germans captured it – unopened). He also started gathering any 10th Brigade veterans who had reached France in two camps in Paimpont and Campeneac. His aim was to preserve the integrity of his former unit and prevent the conscription of some of the best-trained Polish soldiers into standard infantry formations, where their experience would probably have been wasted. However, the French command was initially not interested in the formation of a Polish armoured unit and the Polish 10th Armoured Cavalry Brigade received almost no equipment. It was not until March 1940 that Maczek received a dozen obsolete FT-17 tanks for training, plus a few dozen cars and motorcycles.

Everything changed when Germany invaded France in the spring of 1940, by simply bypassing the Maginot Line. General Maczek's unit suddenly received all the equipment it requested, under one condition: they had to go into action immediately. That proved impossible, because many of Polish soldiers had no experience with the new French equipment and there was no time for training exercises. General Maczek decided instead to lead a small force of his best-trained men, hoping that the rest of his unit would join them later. That small force was called the 10th Armoured Cavalry Brigade (Polish: 10 Brygada Kawalerii Pancernej) in honour of the "Black Brigade" from 1939. On 6 June, 10th Brigade had one tank battalion, two strong motorized cavalry squadrons, one anti-tank battery and one anti-aircraft battery. It was attached to the French 4th Army near Reims and ordered to cover its left flank. However, Maczek's unit was much too weak to achieve success against German armoured divisions. Polish soldiers managed to cover only one retreating French infantry division by attacking German forces in Champaubert-Montgivroux. Later the brigade had to withdraw with the rest of the French troops and joined the French XXIII Corps. On 16 June the brigade attacked by night the town of Montbard over the Burgundy Canal. Maczek's soldiers achieved complete surprise and took many German prisoners.

However, by then the brigade was fighting alone, with the French units on both flanks either routed or in retreat. There were no French forces to take advantage of that victory and the decimated Polish unit found itself surrounded and without fuel. On 18 June, Maczek decided to destroy unusable equipment and withdraw on foot. Later that day he had to split the remnants of his brigade into small groups, so they could pass through the enemy lines. Many of Maczek's men, including the general himself, found their way through Vichy France, North Africa and Portugal to the United Kingdom, where a Polish armored unit was recreated, while others joined the Polish and French resistance organizations in France and Belgium. Maczek relocated to London.

=== Scotland ===
Initially, the British high command wanted to use the recreated Polish Army solely for defence of the Scottish coastline between Aberdeen and Edinburgh, and the veterans of the Polish tank formations who arrived to the UK were pressed into the Polish 2nd Rifle Brigade under General Rudolf Orlicz-Dreszer. However, immediately on Maczek's arrival the idea was abandoned and General Władysław Sikorski managed to persuade the British government to create instead a Polish armoured unit. After two years of training at the Blairgowrie training ground, in February 1942 General Maczek formed the 1st Polish Armoured Division. Initially serving in defence of the Scottish coast between Montrose and the Firth of Forth, the division was equipped by the British authorities with Churchill and M4 Sherman tanks in preparation for the Normandy landings.

=== To Germany ===
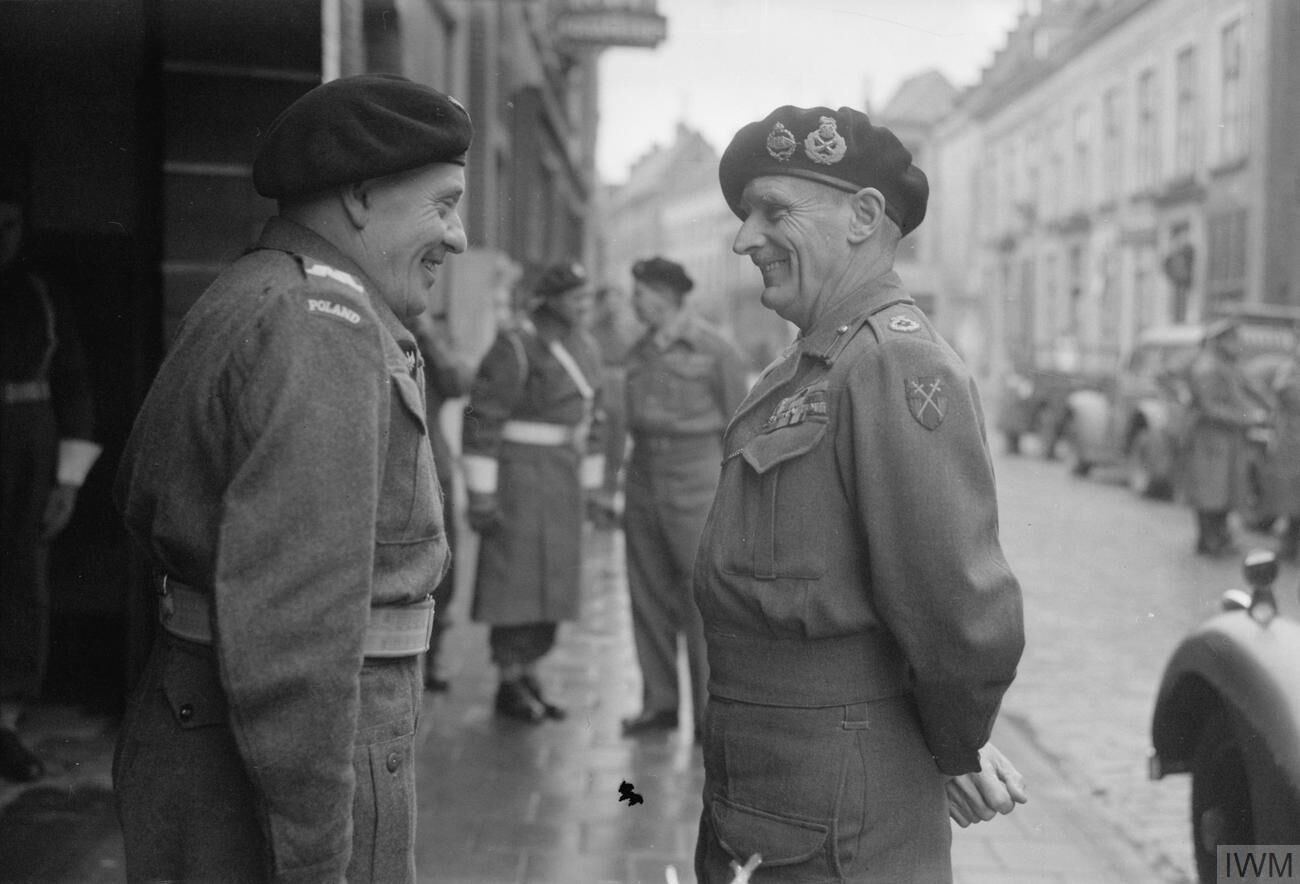
British Field Marshal Sir Bernard Montgomery in conversation with Major General Stanisław Maczek during his visit to the 1st Polish Armoured Division Headquarters in Breda, 25 November 1944.

Towards the end of July 1944 the Polish 1st Armoured Division was transferred to Normandy, where it was to prove its worth during the 1944 invasion of Normandy. Attached to the First Canadian Army, Maczek's men entered combat on 8 August, seeing service during Operation Totalize. The division twice suffered attacks of friendly fire from U.S. Army Air Force aircraft, yet achieved a brilliant victory against the Wehrmacht in the battles for Mont Ormel, Hill 262 and the town of Chambois. In this series of offensive and defensive operations, which came to be known as the Battle of Falaise, 14 German Wehrmacht and SS divisions were trapped in the huge Chambois pocket and destroyed. Maczek's division had the crucial role of closing the pocket to block the escape route of the German divisions.

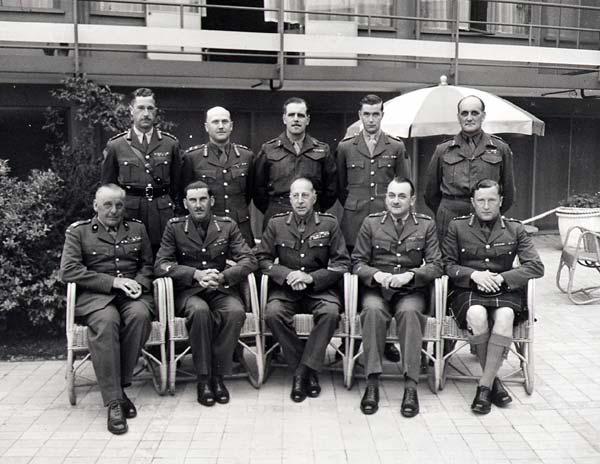
Senior commanders of the First Canadian Army, May 1945. Seated from the left: Stanisław Maczek (Polish Army), Guy Simonds, Harry Crerar, Charles Foulkes, Bert Hoffmeister. Standing from the left: Ralph Keefler, Bruce Matthews, Harry Foster, Robert Moncel (standing in for Chris Vokes, Stuart Rawlins (British Army).

After this decisive battle, Maczek's Division continued to spearhead the Allied drive across the battlefields of northern France, Belgium, the Netherlands and finally Germany. During its progress it liberated Ypres, Oostnieuwkerke, Roeselare, Tielt, Ruislede and Ghent in Belgium. (Coincidentally, the Polish word maczek means "poppy" in English, the symbol of remembrance associated with the area around Ypres in the First World War.) Thanks to an outflanking manoeuvre, it proved possible to free Breda in the Netherlands after a hard fight but without incurring losses in the town's population. A petition on behalf of 40,000 inhabitants of Breda resulted in Maczek being made an honorary Dutch citizen after the war. The Division's finest hour came when its forces accepted the surrender of the German naval base of Wilhelmshaven, taking captive the entire garrison, together with some 200 vessels of Hitler's Kriegsmarine.

Maczek commanded the 1st Armoured Division until the end of European hostilities and was promoted to major-general. After the capitulation of Germany he went on to command the Polish I Corps and became commanding officer of all Polish forces in the United Kingdom until their demobilization in 1947.

== Exile ==
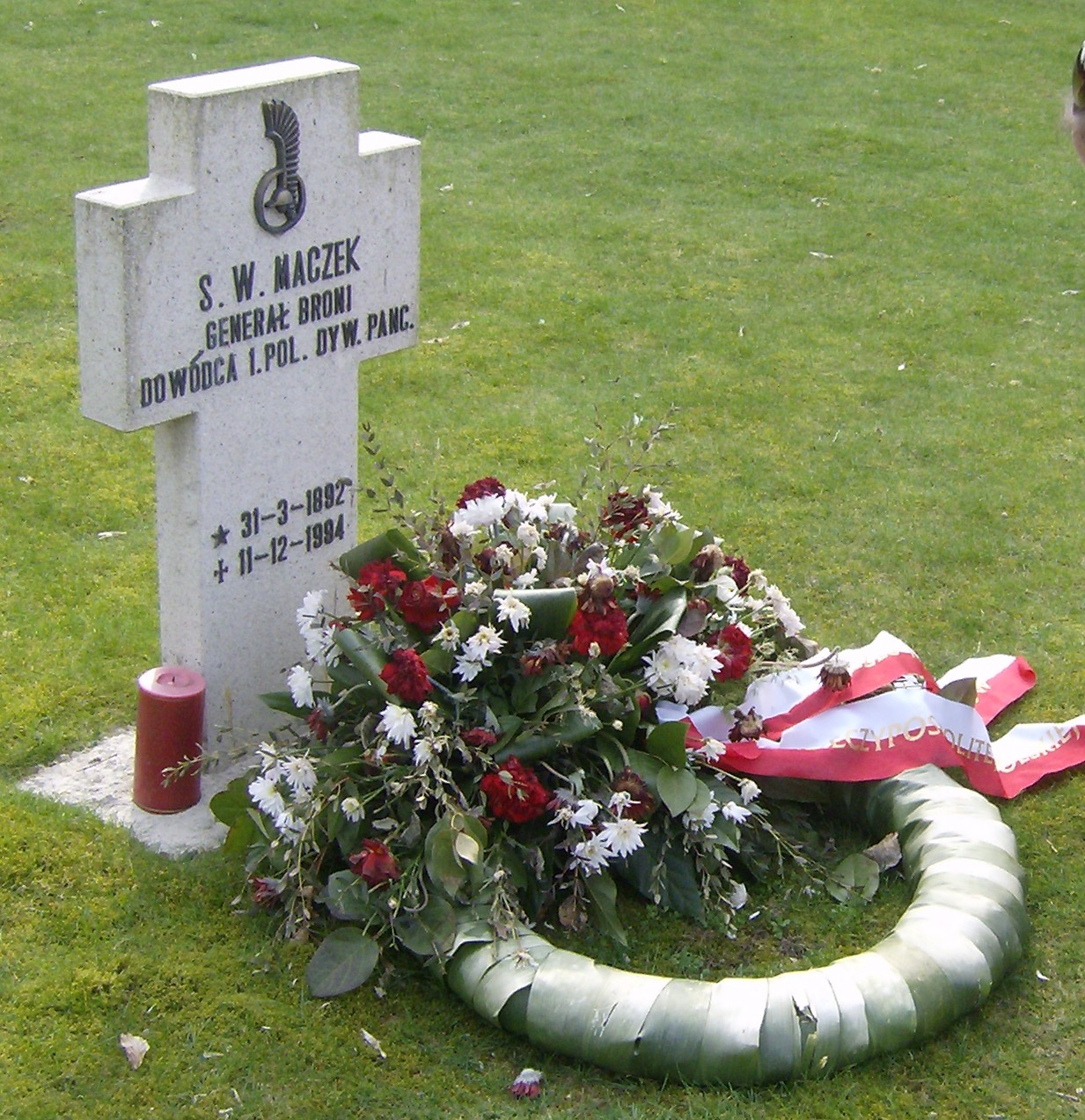
Maczek's grave, Polish cemetery, Breda, Netherlands

After the war, Maczek was stripped of Polish citizenship by the Communist government of the Polish People's Republic, and thus had to remain in Britain. He left the army on 9 September 1948 but was denied a general's pension by the British government as he had not been a member of the British armed forces. As a result, Maczek worked as a barman at an Edinburgh hotel until the 1960s.

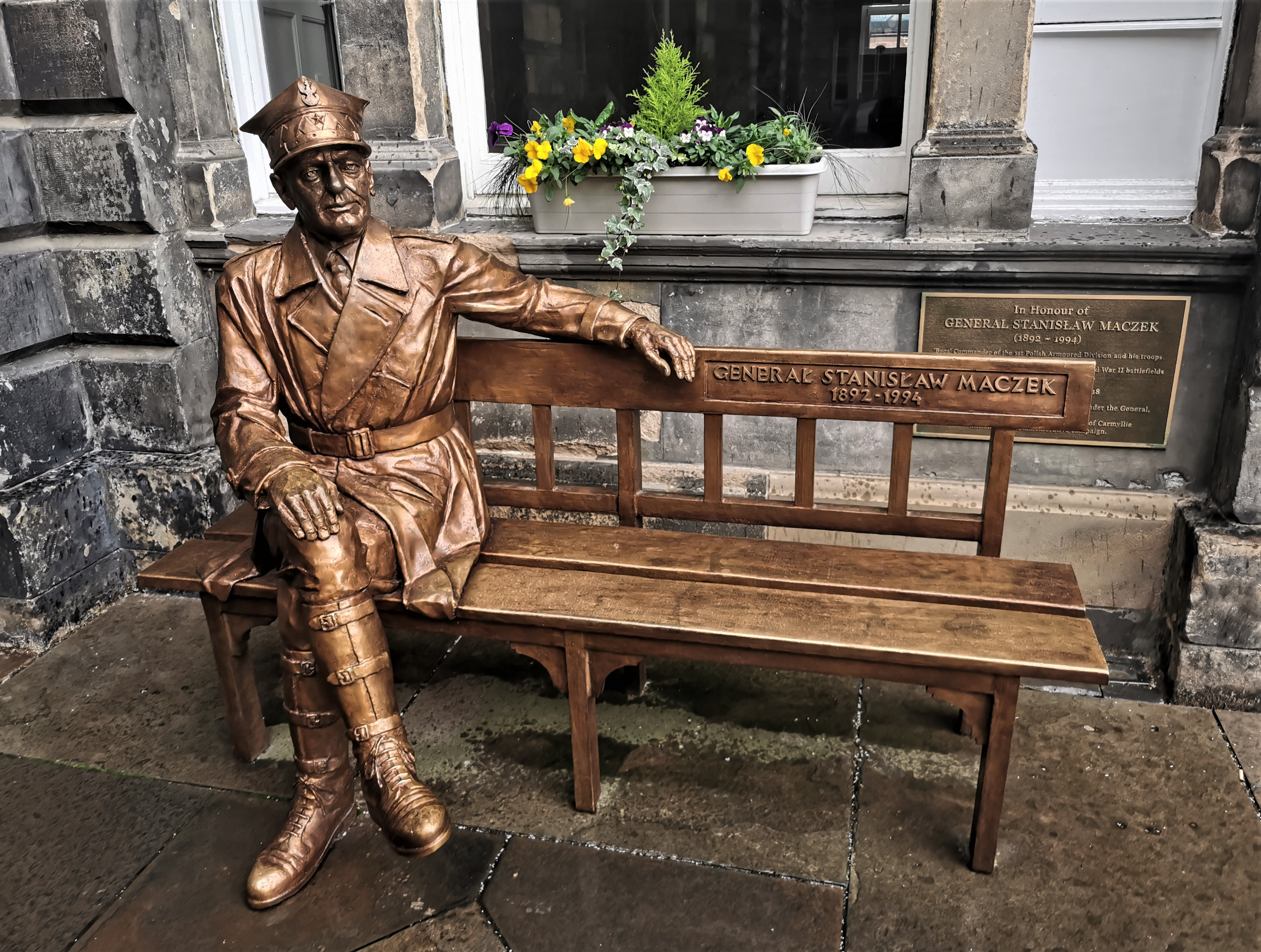
General Stanislaw Maczek, Bench outside Edinburgh Council Chambers.

Although living in the United Kingdom, General Stanisław Maczek had a strong connection to the Netherlands. Besides being a regional hero to the areas he liberated in World War II, he was awarded honorary citizenship of the city of Breda. Recently acquired archive documents show that the Polish general secretly received a yearly allowance from the Dutch government, for the rest of his life. He got his allowance, because Mayor Claudius Prinsen of Breda was worried in 1950, after receiving information that Maczek was in a 'difficult financial situation'. The Polish general was doing unskilled labor to make ends meet. He also had to take care of a chronically ill daughter who needed costly treatment.

The mayor of Breda informed the Dutch national government that a war hero was in financial need. He made an appeal to the government to help the man that liberated the Netherlands. The government decided quickly and awarded Maczek an indexed general's pension, which was paid for by the Ministry of Foreign affairs from a secret budget. The Dutch government did not want this to be made public, due to its sensitive nature. In the Cold War period, announcing that the Dutch were paying a non-communist Polish ex-general, would certainly strain diplomatic relations with the communist Polish government and the Soviet Union. Not to mention, it would confront the British government with a not so proud moment in their history. Uninformed about his improved financial situation, the Dutch public responded at once in 1965 when news came that his chronically ill daughter needed costly medical treatment in Spain. The Dutch population raised a substantial amount of money following a national radio broadcast for the Maczek family, helping out the general that liberated them.

In 1972 an appeal was made by the Poolse Katholieke Vereniging in Nederland to the Dutch Parliament. This organization became the voice for the remaining Polish veterans in the Netherlands and asked for compensation of pension lost due to the aftermath of the war. The Dutch Ministry of Defence did not meet this request, based upon the Algemene Militaire Pensioenwet (1966), which stipulates that non-Dutch persons needed to have been associated with the Dutch Armed Forces during the war period, in order to be entitled to a wartime pension.

In 1989, the last Polish Communist Government of Prime Minister Mieczysław Rakowski issued a public apology to the General, and in 1994 he was presented with Poland's highest state decoration, the Order of the White Eagle.

Lieutenant General Stanisław Maczek died on 11 December 1994, at the age of 102. According to his last wish, he was laid to rest among his soldiers at the Polish military cemetery in Breda, the Netherlands. Next to the cemetery the Maczek Memorial Breda was opened in 2020. Each year during Liberation Day festivities, Breda is visited by a large Polish contingent and the city devotes part of the festivities to the fallen Polish soldiers.

Many artefacts and memorabilia belonging to Maczek and the 1st Polish Armoured Division are on display in the Polish Institute and Sikorski Museum in London.

In 2018 a bronze statue was unveiled in honour of General Maczek in the quadrangle of the Edinburgh City Chambers. A footpath crossing Bruntsfield Links which leads to the general's former home in Arden Street in Marchmont, has been named General Maczek Walk.

== Honours and awards ==
- Order of the White Eagle (1994)
- Knight's Cross of the Order of Virtuti Militari
- Gold Cross of the Order of Virtuti Militari
- Silver Cross of the Order of Virtuti Militari
- Grand Cross of the Order of Polonia Restituta
- Commander's Cross of the Order of Polonia Restituta
- Cross of Valour
- Gold Cross of Merit with Swords
- Grand Officer of the Order of the Crown with Palms (Belgium)
- Croix de Guerre with Palms (Belgium)
- Commandeur of the Legion of Honour (France)
- Croix de Guerre with Palms (France)
- Médaille commémorative de la guerre 1939–1945 (France)
- Commander of the Order of Orange-Nassau (Netherlands)
- Order of the Star of Romania IV Class (Romania)
- Companion of the Order of the Bath (United Kingdom)
- Distinguished Service Order (United Kingdom)

== Gallery ==
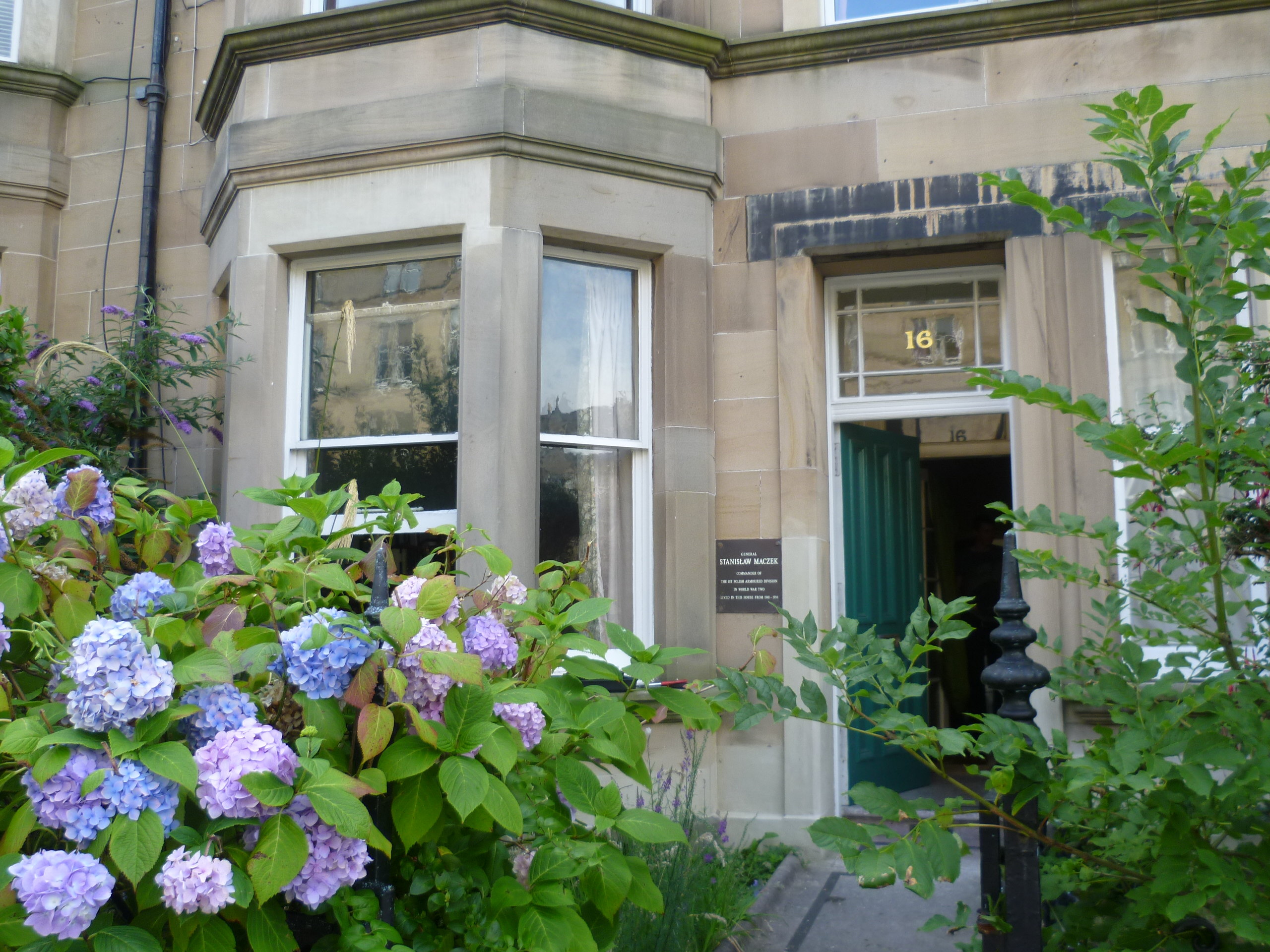
General Maczek's home, 1948–94, Marchmont district of Edinburgh, Scotland

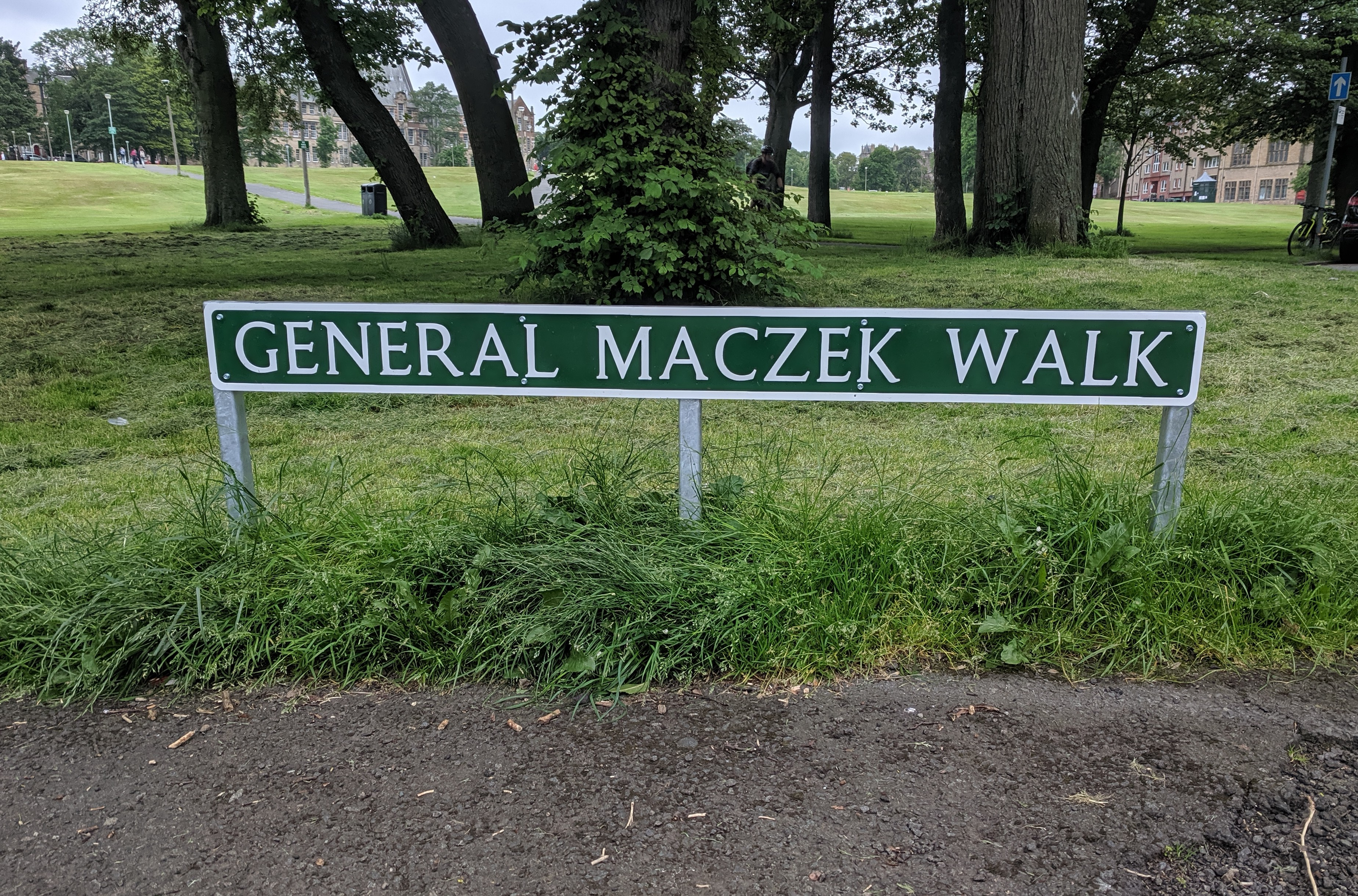
General Maczek Walk, Bruntsfield Links, Edinburgh, Scotland

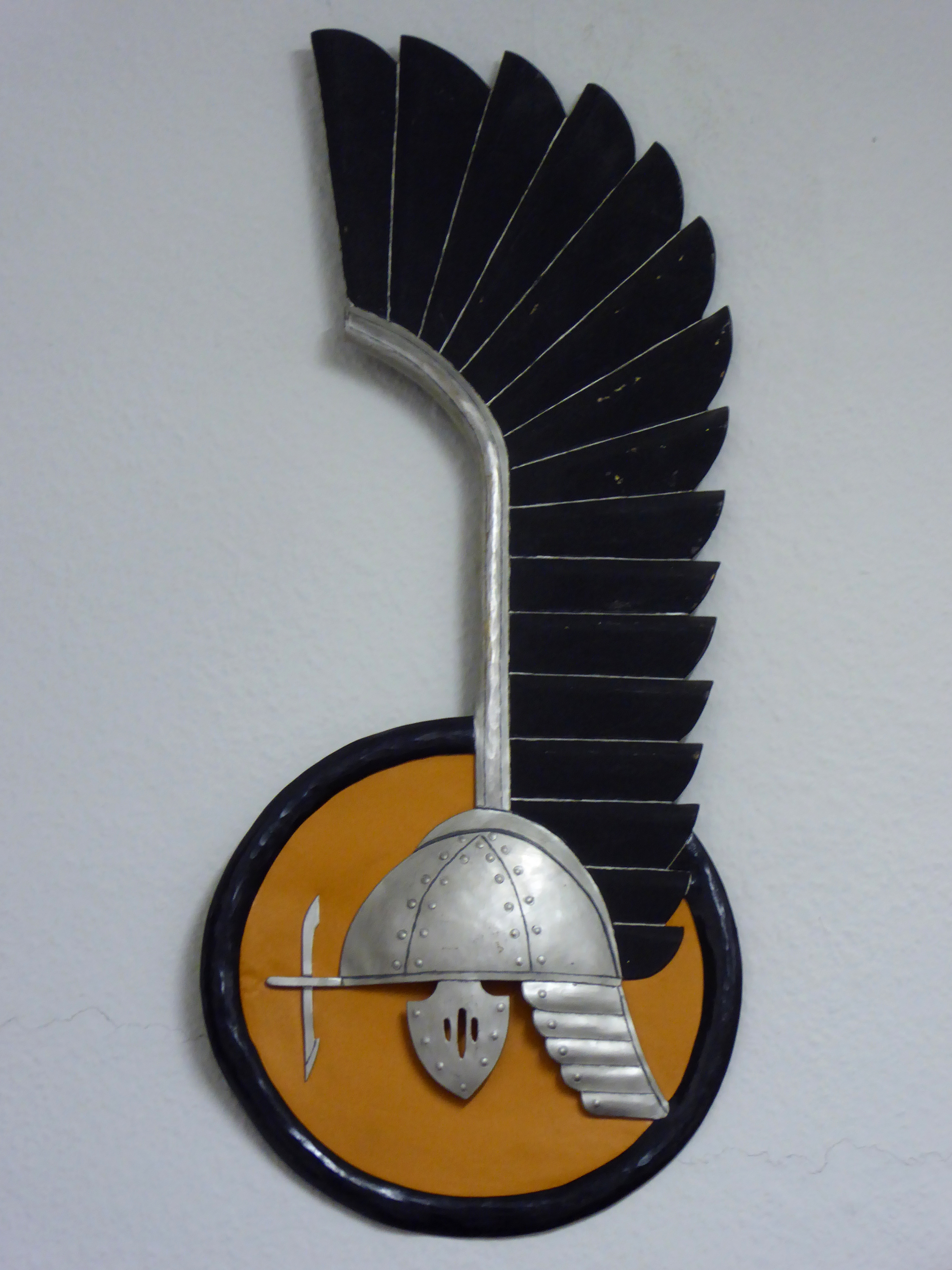
Emblem of Polish 1st Armoured Division, Polish Institute and Sikorski Museum, London

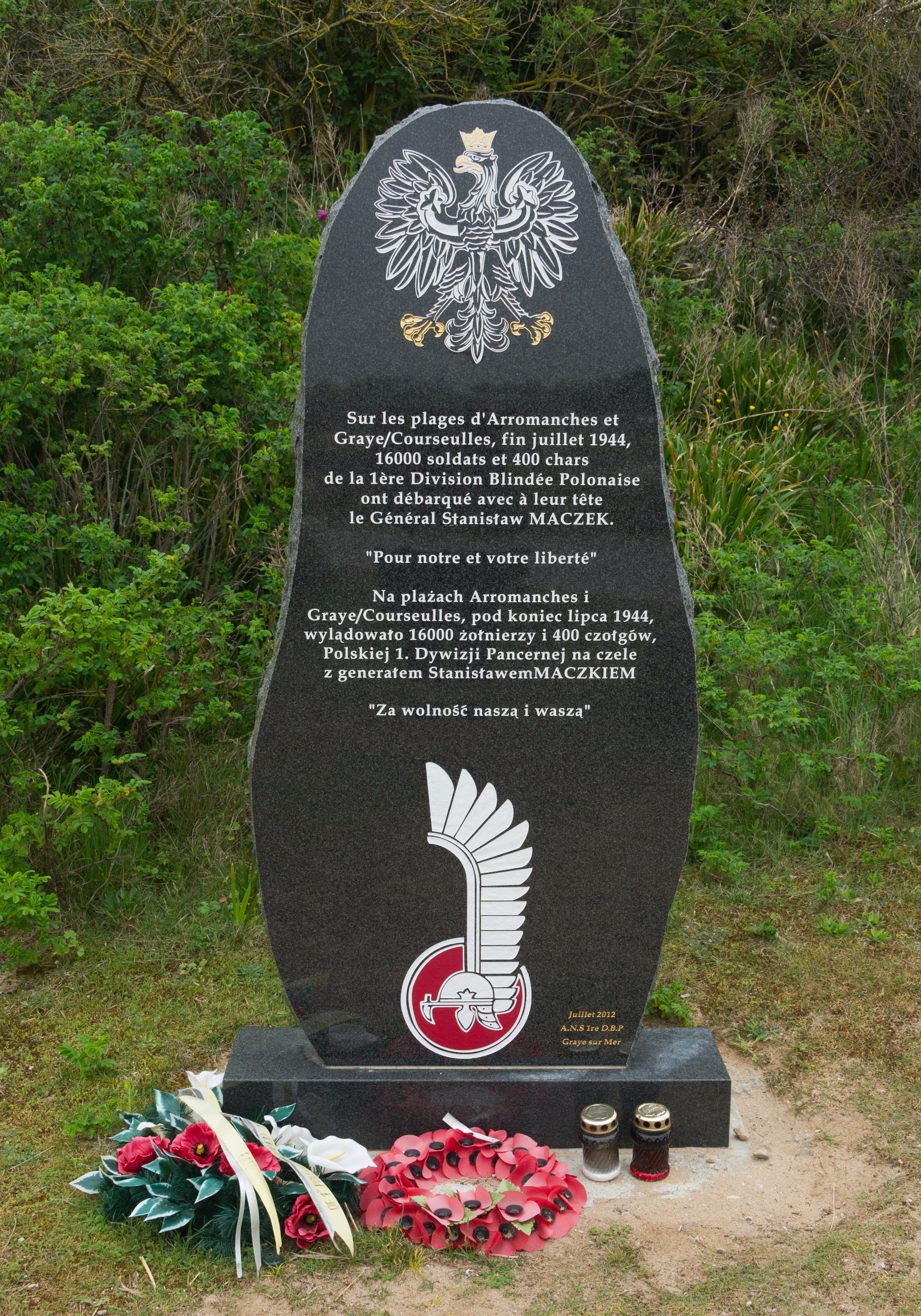
Polish 1st Armoured Division Memorial, Normandy, France

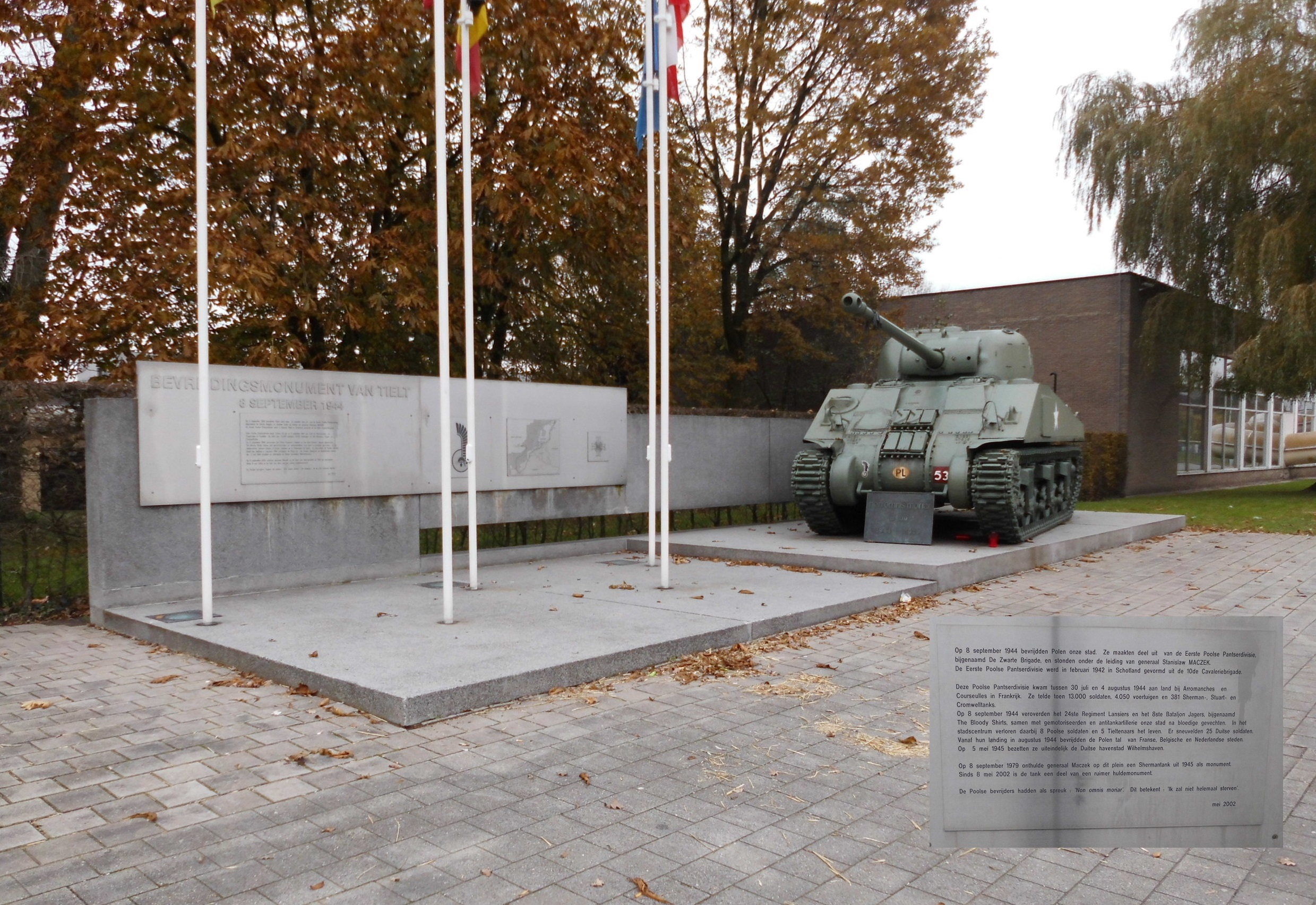
Polish 1st Armoured Division Memorial, Tielt, Belgium

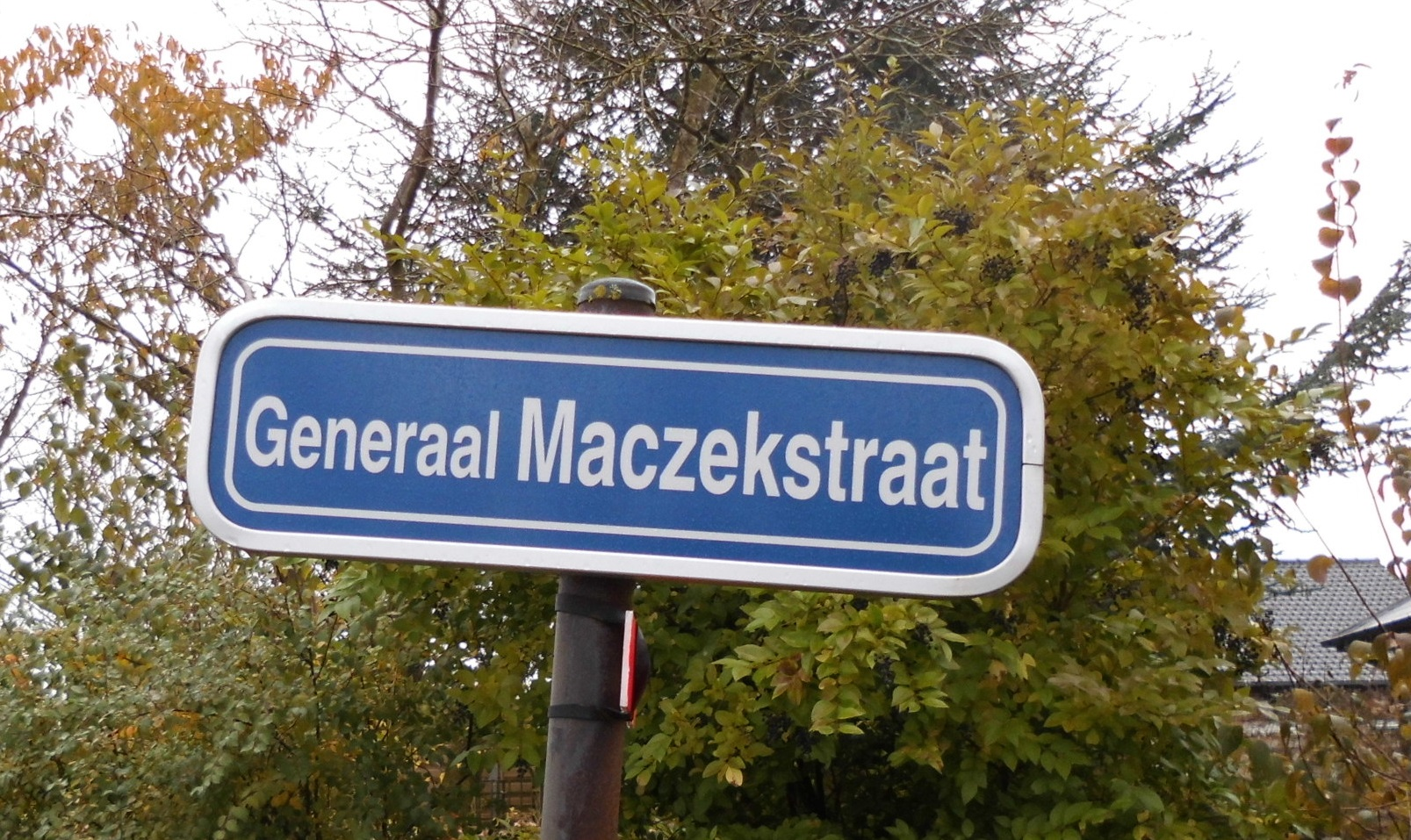
Street named after General Maczek, Aalter-Brug, Belgium

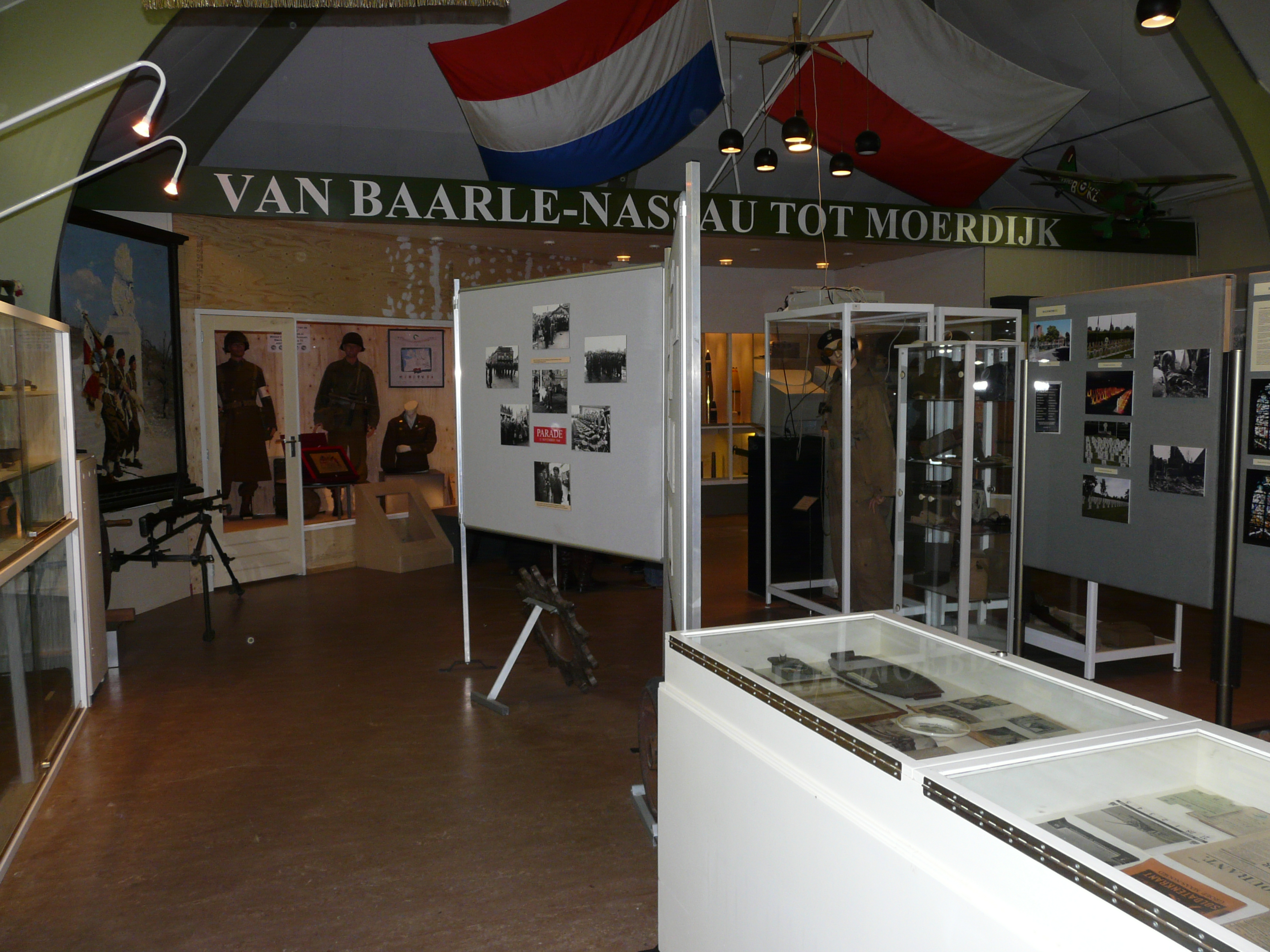
General Maczek Museum, Breda, Netherlands

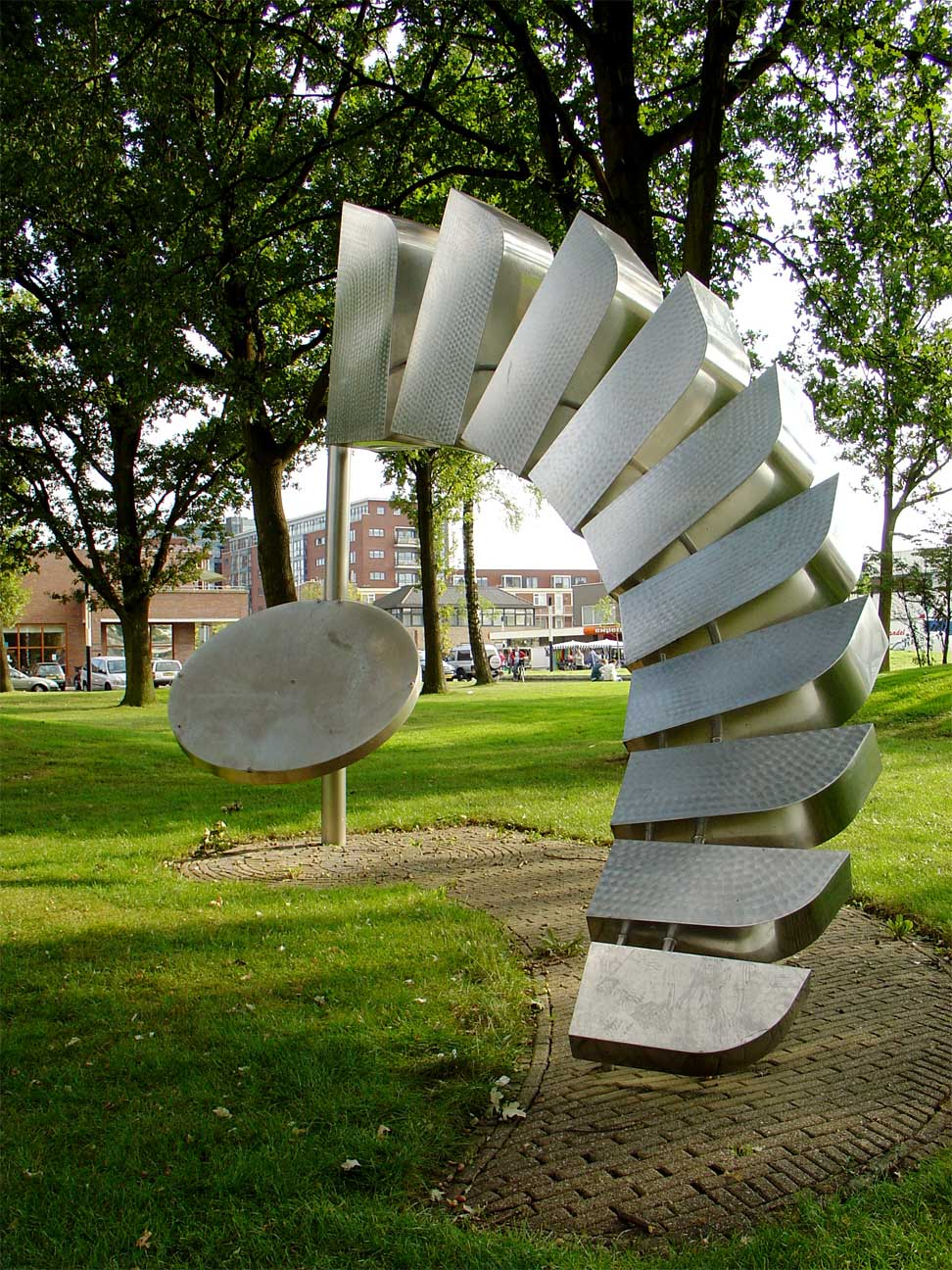
General Maczek Memorial by Karin Hardonk, General Maczek Square, Stadskanaal, Netherlands

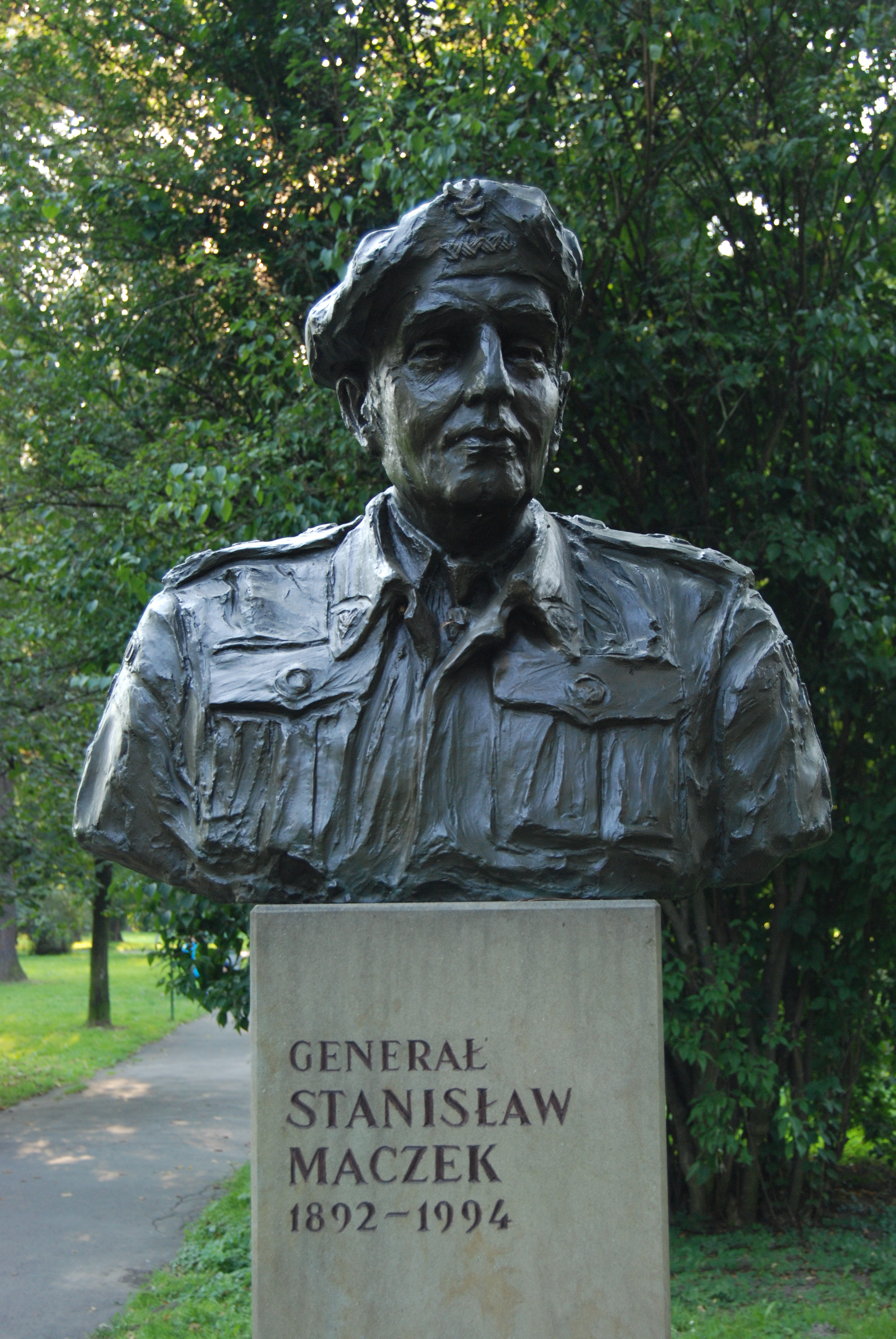
Bust of General Maczek, Kraków, Poland

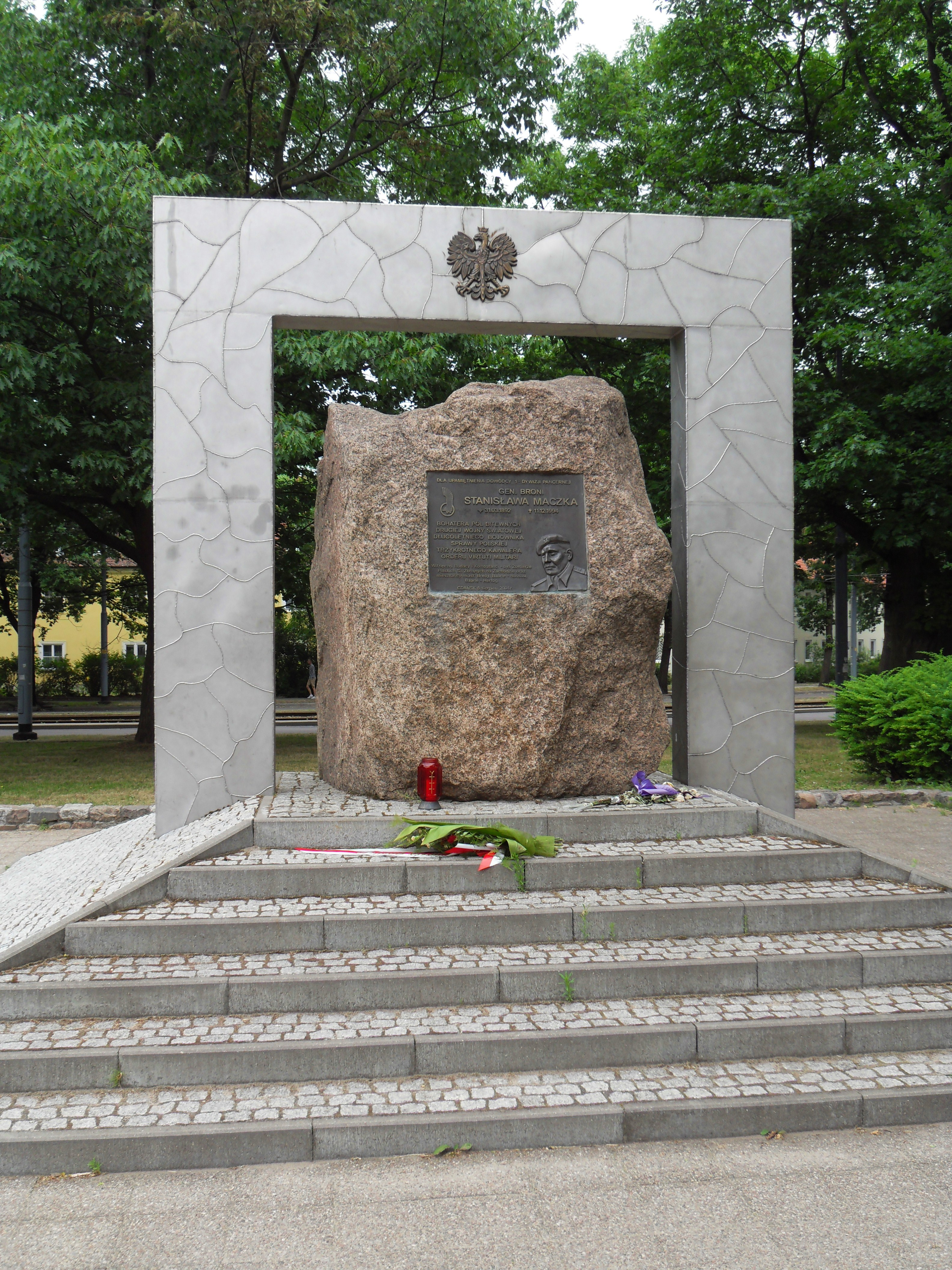
General Maczek Memorial, Gdańsk, Poland

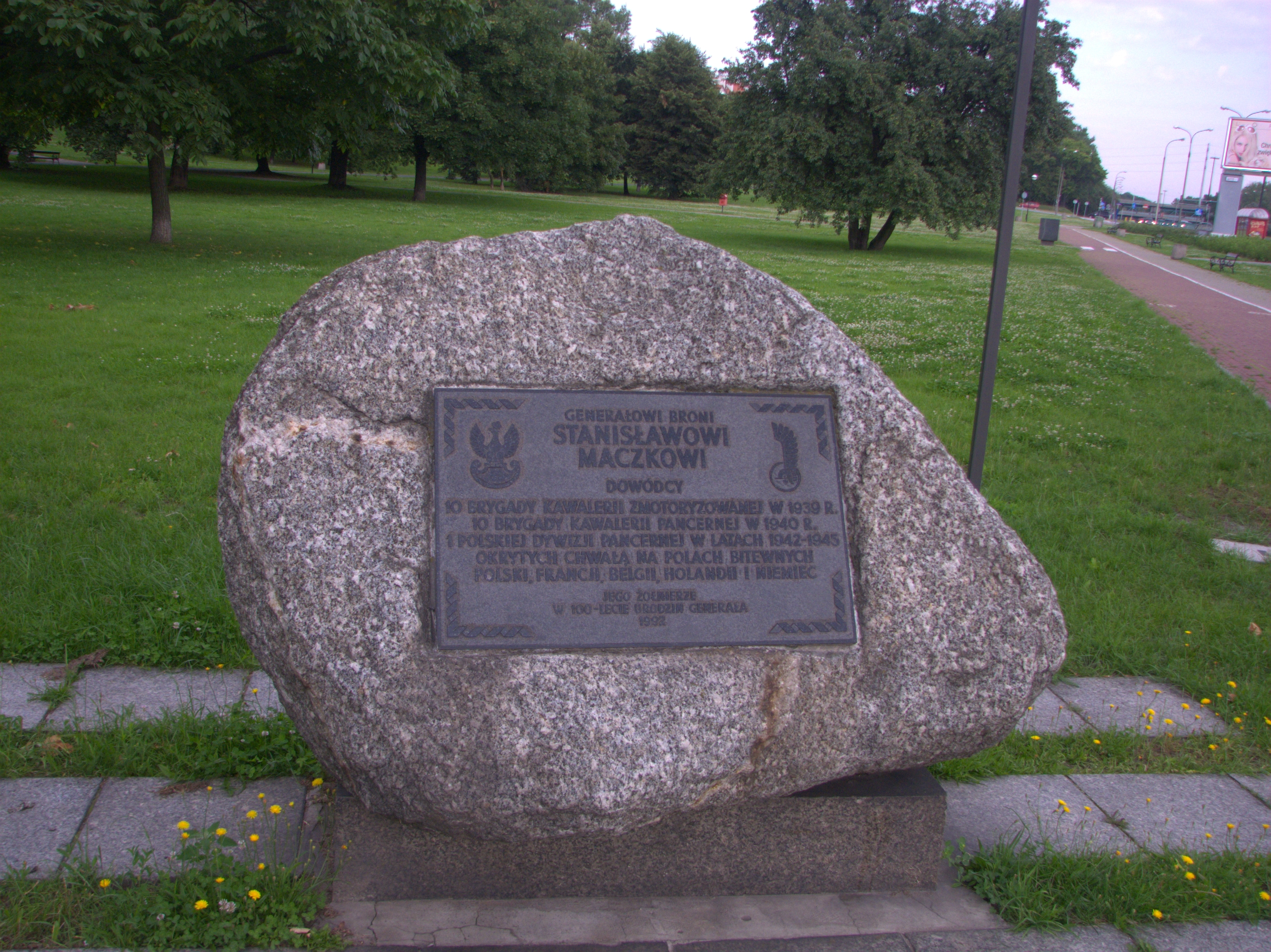
General Maczek Memorial, Warsaw, Poland

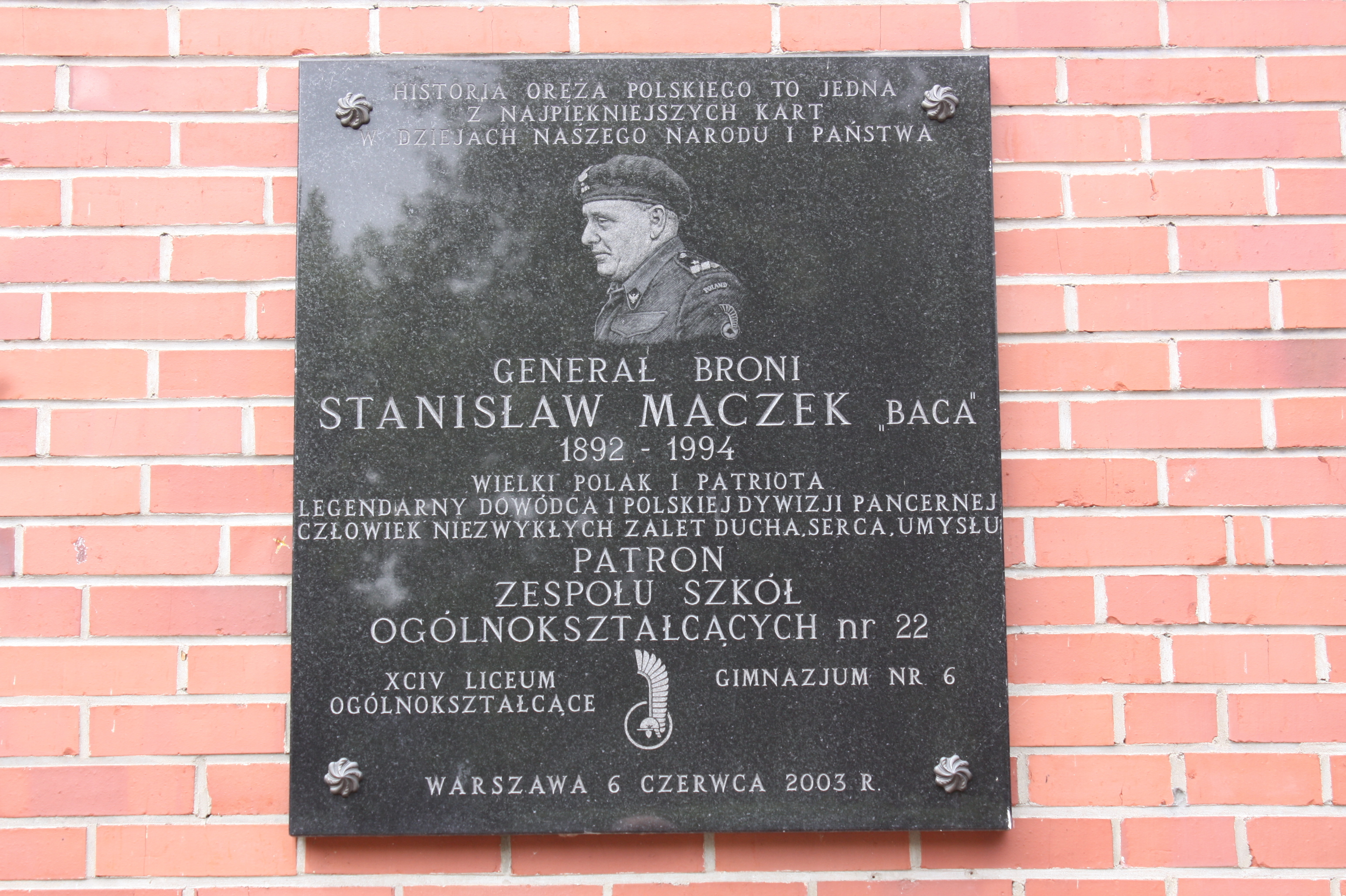
General Maczek memorial plaque, Warsaw, Poland

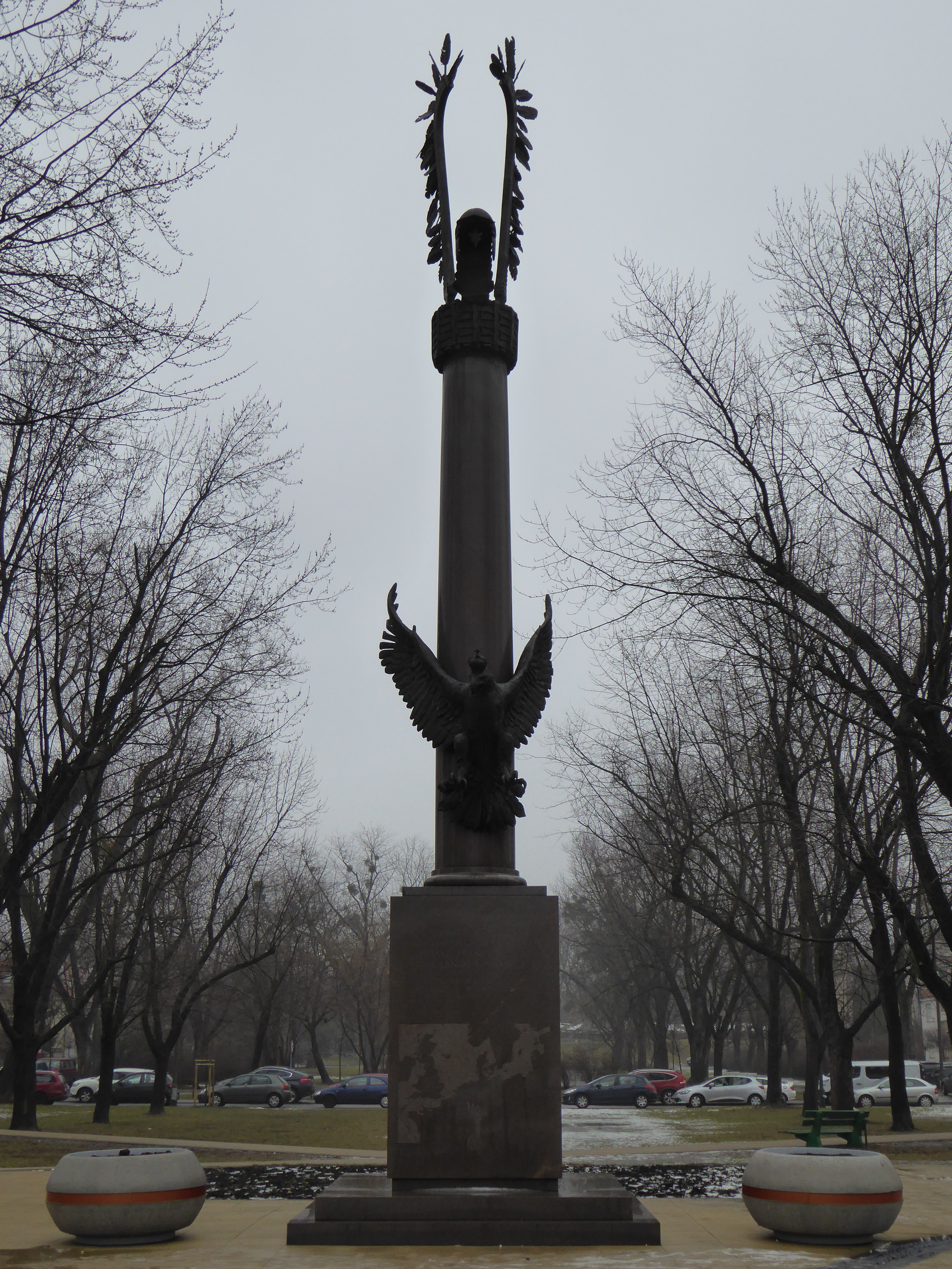
Polish 1st Armoured Division Memorial, Warsaw, Poland

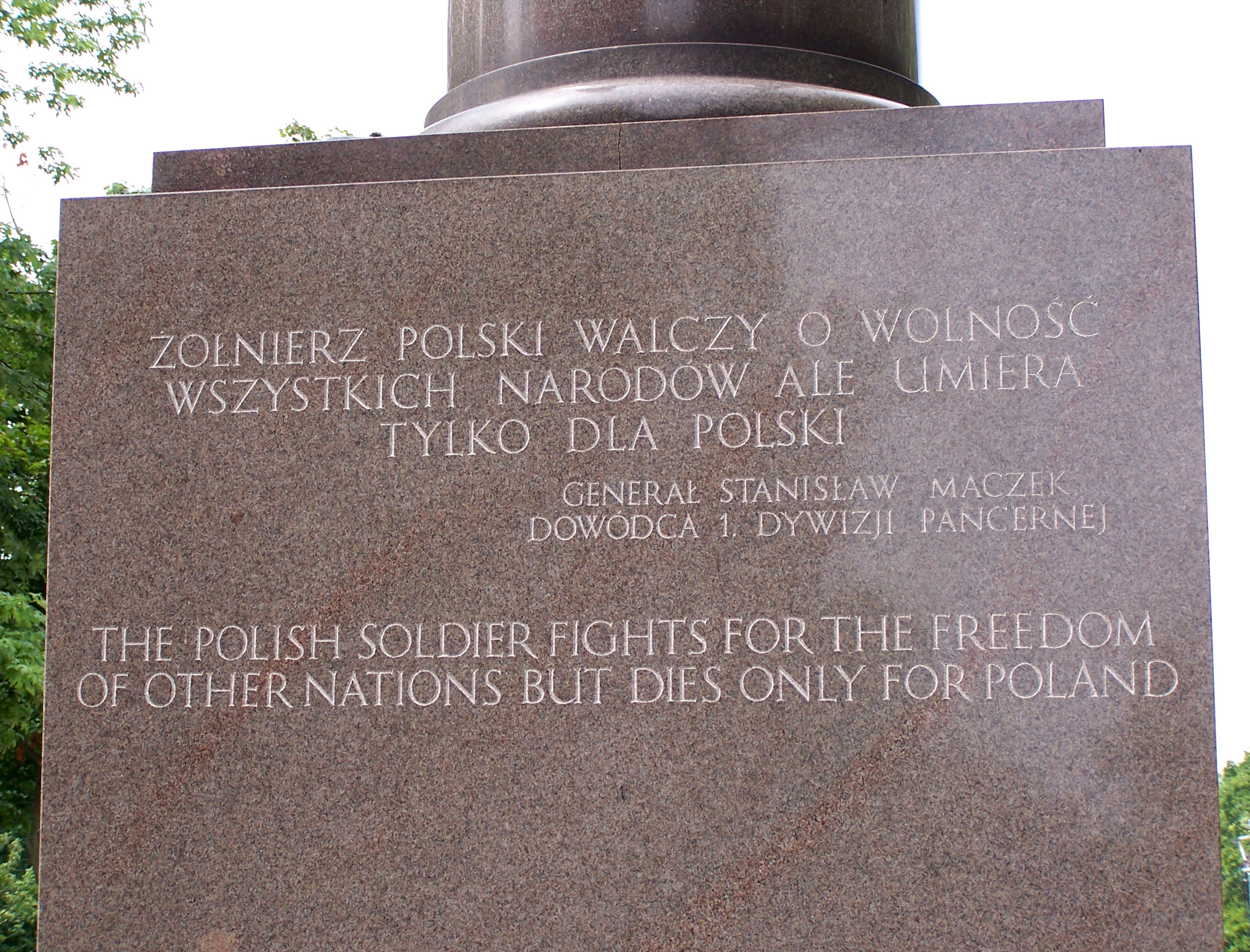
Maczek quotation on reverse of Memorial: "The Polish soldier fights for the freedom of all nations but dies only for Poland."

== In popular culture ==
Maczek, as the leader of the 10th Motorized Cavalry Brigade, is a historical figure in the novel A Witness to Gallantry: An American Spy in Poland 1939.

In The Death of the Fronsac by Neal Ascherson, a Polish officer, Maurycy Szczucki, serves with General Maczek in World War II. After the war, Szczucki returns to Edinburgh where he discovers the impoverished Maczek working as a barman in the Learmonth Hotel. The General is frequently visited by old comrades, who "salute him before they order a whisky."

Maczek is referred to in Alexander McCall Smith's short story, "In Sandy Bell's". The protagonist's landlady tells of the general working in a bar in Edinburgh. "He wasn't too proud. His men saluted him when they ordered a drink."

== See also ==
- List of Poles
- Polish contribution to World War II
- Polish Armed Forces in the West
- Western betrayal
- World War II Behind Closed Doors: Stalin, the Nazis and the West
- Poles in the United Kingdom
- Great Polish Map of Scotland
- Stanisław Sosabowski
