= 24th Uhlan Regiment (Poland) =

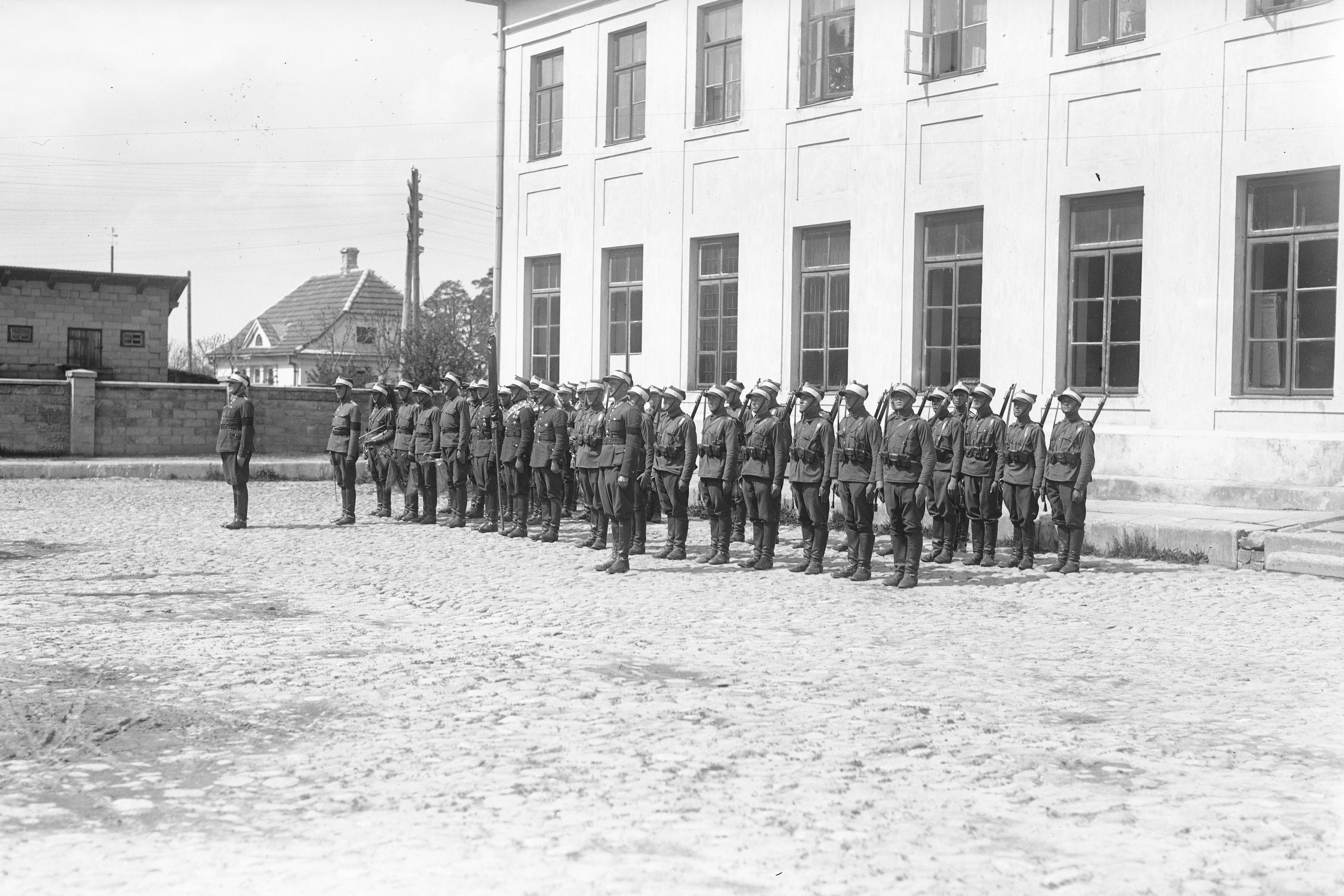
Honor Guard of the 24th Uhlan Regiment in Kraśnik in 1935

24th Uhlan Regiment of Crown Hetman Stanislaw Zolkiewski (Polish: 24 Pulk Ulanów im. Hetmana Wielkiego Koronnego Stanislawa Zolkiewskiego, 24 p.ul.) was a cavalry unit of the Polish Army in the Second Polish Republic. Formed in June 1920, it fought both in the Polish–Soviet War and the 1939 Invasion of Poland. The regiment was garrisoned in the town of Kraśnik, and belonged to the elite 10th Motorized Cavalry Brigade.

The history of the regiment dates back to June 1920, when it was formed in Lwów and Stanisławów. The unit was based on the 214th Volunteer Army Uhlan Regiment, and soon after forming, it was sent to fight against the Red Army in the area of Zamość, Volhynia and then Central Lithuania.

During the interbellum period the regiment was garrisoned in Kraśnik. As part of the 10th Motorized Cavalry Brigade, in late autumn of 1938 it entered the areas that had belonged to Czechoslovakia (see Trans-Olza, Independent Operational Group Silesia). On 27 November 1938, the regiment clashed with Czechoslovak forces near the town of Ždiar, Slovakia.

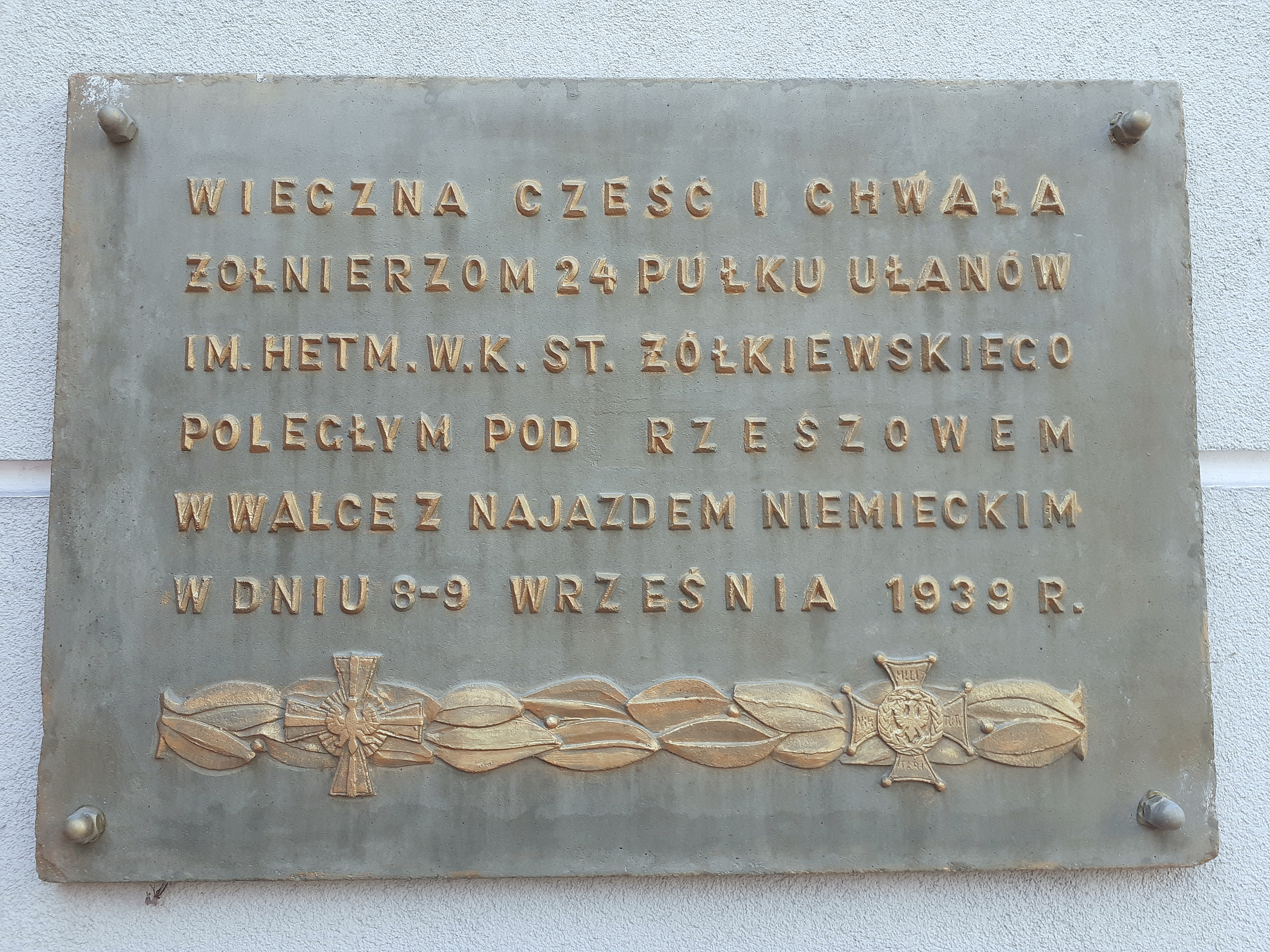
Plaque to the 24th Uhlan Regiment in Rzeszów, commemorating their fight against invading Germans at Rzeszów in September 1939

During the Invasion of Poland, the regiment fought in the Battle of Jordanów, the Battle of Wysoka, and several other locations, including Łańcut, Rzeszów and Radymno. On 19 September 1939, it crossed the Hungarian border, escaping German or Soviet captivity. In recognition of the bravery of its soldiers, the unit was awarded the Virtuti Militari.

In 1940, the Kraśnik Uhlans were re-created in France, and then in England. In 1943, the regiment became an armoured unit, fighting in Western Europe as part of the 10th Armoured Cavalry Brigade.

== Commandants ==
- Colonel Tadeusz Zolkiewski (1920),
- Major Jan Kanty Olszewski (1921),
- Colonel Rudolf Lang (1921–1929),
- Colonel Kazimierz Halicki (1929–1932),
- Colonel Kazimierz Dworak (1932–1940),
- Colonel Jerzy Deskur (1940–1942),
- Colonel Bogumil Szumski (1942–1943),
- Major Jan Kanski (1943–1944),
- Colonel Romuald Dowbor (1944–1947),
- Major Tadeusz Wysocki (1947).

== Symbols ==
Regimental flag, funded by former soldiers of the 214th Volunteer Army Uhlan Regiment, was handed to the unit by Józef Piłsudski, in Warsaw on 30 April 1923. It featured the sign "214 PU A.O." and the inscription "Honour and Fatherland" on one side, and the number 24 together with the White Eagle on the other side. In the autumn of 1939, the flag was taken to France, and then to Great Britain. On 11 November 1966 in London, the flag was awarded Silver Cross of the Virtuti Militari, by General Władysław Anders.

The badge, approved in January 1928, was shaped after the Cross of Valour, with a silver Eagle in the middle.

== Sources ==
- Piotr Bauer: Zarys historii wojennej pułków polskich w kampanii wrześniowej. 17 Pułk Ułanów Wielkopolskich. Warszawa: Oficyna Wydawnicza „Ajaks", 1994
- Henryk Smaczny: Księga kawalerii polskiej 1914–1947: rodowody, barwa, broń. Warszawa: TESCO, 1989
