= 10th Motorized Cavalry Brigade (Poland) =

10th Motorised Cavalry Brigade
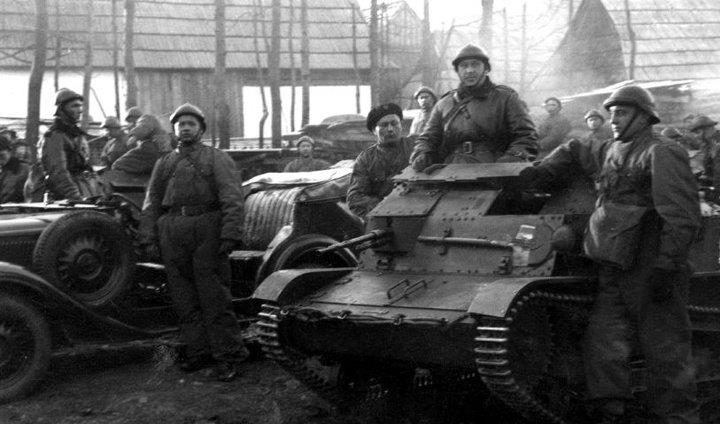
- 10th Motorized Cavalry Brigade in Rzeszów, 1938
- Active: 1937-1939
- Country: Poland
- Branch: Land forces
- Type: Armoured
- Size: ~40 tanks and tankettes
- Nickname: "The Black Brigade"
- Engagements: Battle of Jordanów, Battle of Lwów

Commanders
- Notable commanders: Stanisław Maczek

The 10th Cavalry Brigade (Polish: 10. Brygada Kawalerii) was a Polish military unit in World War II. It was the only fully operational Polish motorized infantry unit during the Invasion of Poland, as Warsaw Armoured Motorized Brigade was not completed by September 1, 1939.

Commanded by Colonel, later General Stanisław Maczek, it is considered one of few Polish World War II military units (brigade size or larger) not to have been decisively defeated in 1939. Another notable large unit was General Franciszek Kleeberg's Independent Operational Group Polesie.

== Organized in 1937 ==
The unit was organized in February 1937, partly as an experiment. It was to be a hybrid between a standard motorized infantry brigade and the French concept of Division legere. As Polish cavalry generals still had some doubts about the value of mechanized forces, there was some opposition against reforming standard cavalry units into motorized units. Testing of the new unit was held in a specially created training ground near Kielce, as well as in the Armoured Units Training School. The brigade was conceived as an emergency unit in the Commander-in-Chief's reserve. Its task was to screen the areas of concentration of Polish troops, to close gaps made by enemy forces in Polish lines and to fight enemy mechanized units.

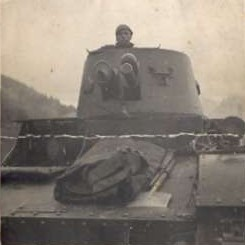
10th Brigade Vickers E tank

== 1939 exercise ==
The Brigade's first offensive exercise, in 1939, was considered a failure. The Brigade had inadequate anti-tank ordnance to counter potential enemy armoured units. The Brigade was also thought insufficiently versatile, especially compared with a standard cavalry unit, which had much better off-road capabilities and speed. Because of that, several structural changes were introduced which would later be copied during the formation of the Warsaw Armoured Cavalry Brigade.

The 10th Motorized Cavalry Brigade's commanding officer was Colonel Stanisław Maczek, and his chief of staff was Major Franciszek Skibiński. Though the Brigade was fully motorized, it was still officially called the "10th Cavalry Brigade"; however, most print sources refer to it as "Motorized" to distinguish it from its predecessor.

== Role during invasion of Poland ==
During the Invasion of Poland in September 1939, the brigade was attached to the Kraków Army defending Lesser Poland and Silesia. Equipped with only light tanks and tankettes and without a battalion ("dywizjon") of heavy artillery attached to it, which left the unit with only 8 heavier cannons, it went into battle during the first day of the German invasion. After the Battle of Jordanów Maczek's unit faced the entire German XVIII Corps of General Eugen Beyer and successfully shielded the southern flank of the Polish forces along the Beskids. Supported by several battalions of Border Guards and National Defense forces, the Polish motorized unit fought against two Panzer divisions (4th Light Division under von Hubicki and the 2nd Panzer Division under Veiel), as well as the 3rd Mountain Division under Eduard Dietl.

For five days Maczek's brigade effectively slowed the German advance. Despite numerical and technical superiority, the German units' daily gain was no more than 10 kilometres. Polish soldiers took advantage of difficult, mountainous terrain, stopping German attacks and occasionally counter-attacking. However, after the front of the Kraków Army was broken to the north of brigade's position, it was pulled out from the front line. The brigade then fought as a screening unit, defending the bridges and fords in Lesser Poland, until it arrived in Lwów and joined the city's defenders. The unit was to be formed into a mobile reserve during the battle for Lwów to facilitate the withdrawal of other Polish units towards the Romanian Bridgehead. However, the plan was made obsolete by the invasion of Poland by the Soviet Union on September 17. After two days, Edward Rydz-Śmigły, Marshal of Poland ordered the brigade to cross the Hungarian border.

Colonel Maczek's brigade was interned in Hungary. The unit lost about half of its men, but was never defeated in open combat, gaining even the enemy's respect. The Germans called the 10th Cavalry Brigade "Die Schwarze Brigade" – "The Black Brigade", because of the black jackets worn by the Polish mechanized troops.

In his book Invincible Black Brigade: Polish 10th Cavalry Brigade 1939, the author Jerzy Majka states that the black leather jackets were worn only by officers and NCOs. They were also worn by motorcycle troops and armour crewman - certainly enough black leather to acquire the nickname "The Black Brigade".

== Fighting in France ==
The unit's history did not, however, end in 1939. With the tacit support of Hungarians, most of its soldiers managed to reach France to join the Polish Army led by General Sikorski. They fought in France in 1940 as the renamed 10th Armoured Cavalry Brigade. During the Fall of France in June 1940 the veterans of "The Black Brigade" were evacuated to Great Britain where they became the core of the Polish 1st Armoured Division formed in February 1942.

== Order of battle ==
	Regiment	Sub-units	Notes
10th Cavalry Brigade Stanisław Maczek	10th Mounted Rifle Regiment; Bokszczanin	4 x motorised rifle squadrons 1 x HMG squadron 1 x AT platoon	3 infantry and 1 HMG platoons each 12 x Ckm wz.30 HMGs, 2 x 81mm mortars 3 x 37mm wz.36 Bofors AT guns
10th Cavalry Brigade Stanisław Maczek	24th Uhlan Regiment; Dworak	4 x motorised rifle squadrons 1 x HMG squadron 1 x AT platoon	3 infantry and 1 HMG platoons each 12 x Ckm wz.30 HMGs, 2 x 81mm mortars 3 x 37mm wz.36 Bofors AT guns
10th Cavalry Brigade Stanisław Maczek	16th Motorised Artillery Battalion; Żmudziński	1 x field artillery battery 1 x howitzer battery	4 x 75 mm wz.97 guns 4 x 100 mm wz.14 Skoda howitzers
10th Cavalry Brigade Stanisław Maczek	101st Recce Tank Company; Ziemski		4 x 20 mm TKS; 9 x TK3
10th Cavalry Brigade Stanisław Maczek	121st Light Tank Company; Rączkowski		16 x Vickers E
10th Cavalry Brigade Stanisław Maczek	Recce Tank Company; Święcicki		4 x TKS; 9 x TKF
10th Cavalry Brigade Stanisław Maczek	Anti-tank Company; Moszczeński		18 x 37 mm wz.36 Bofors AT guns
10th Cavalry Brigade Stanisław Maczek	90th Motorised Engineering Battalion; Dorant	2 x engineering company
10th Cavalry Brigade Stanisław Maczek	71st Motorised AA Artillery Battery; Zwil		4 x 40 mm wz.36 Bofors AA guns

== In popular culture ==
A detailed account of the brigade and its actions is a major part of the historical fiction novel A Witness to Gallantry: An American Spy in Poland 1939.

== See also ==
- Captain Kazimierz DUDA - 1st Polish Armoured Division - C.K.M.
- short documentary
- Brigade, Propaganda, and Lost Opportunity
