= Battle of Jarosław =

Coordinates: 50°01′00″N 22°40′00″E

- Part of Invasion of Poland
Date	10–11 September 1939
Location	Jarosław, Lwów Voivodeship, Poland
Result	German victory

Belligerents
Germany	Poland

Commanders and leaders
(Nazi Germany) Alfred Ritter von Hubicki (Nazi Germany) Rudolf Veiel	(Second Polish Republic) Jan Wójcik (Second Polish Republic) Stanisław Maczek

Strength
2 armoured divisions	10th Cavalry Brigade; 4 infantry battalions 20 guns

Casualties and losses
At least a few tanks	Negligible

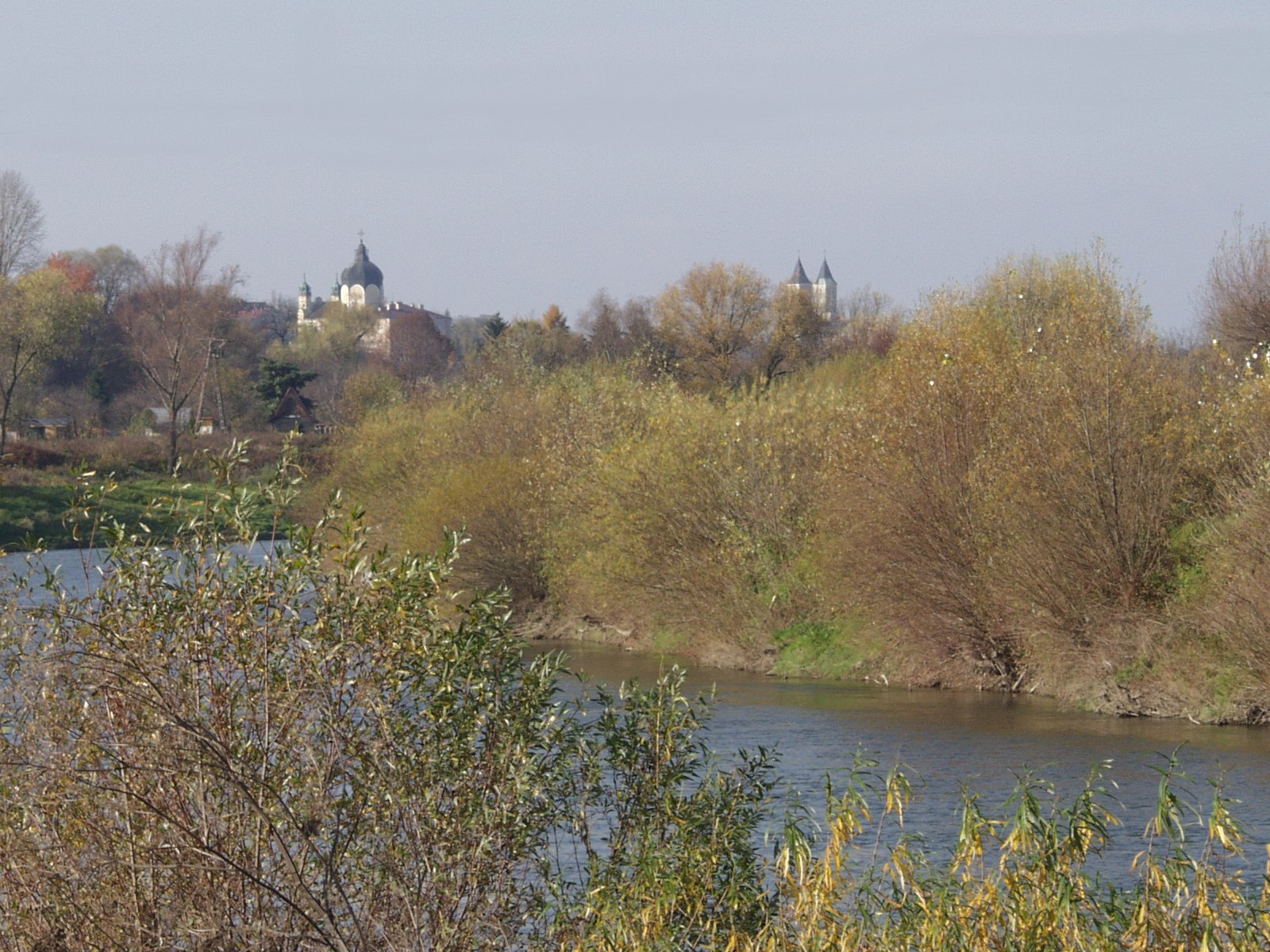
The San river in Jarosław, the approximate site of the battle

The Battle of Jarosław (known as the Defence of Jarosław in Polish sources) took place between 10 and 11 September 1939 in the city of Jarosław on the San River. During the battle the Polish forces of General Stanisław Maczek successfully held the river crossings in the town for two days against the Nazi German Wehrmacht, which was enough time for the Polish 10th Motorized Cavalry Brigade to cross the river and retreat further eastwards.

== Before the battle ==
Contrary to most other Polish armies during the Polish Defensive War of 1939, the Kraków Army managed to withstand the initial German assault on Silesia and retreat steadily eastwards. The Carpathians in the south and the Vistula river to the north provided enough cover for the army to focus on delaying actions in the path of the advancing Germans. However, the German numerical and technical superiority meant that the Polish forces were too weak to counter-attack and the best choice for the army was to hold the lines of rivers and major towns on the path of the Polish retreat.

One such line was to be prepared along the San River by General Wacław Scaevola-Wieczorkiewicz, the pre-war commanding officer of the Przemyśl-based 10th Corps Area, one of the peacetime units in the Polish Army. The preparations started on 7 September. However, as most forces in the area were already mobilized and most march battalions were sent to the front, the defensive positions along the river banks were severely undermanned. The following day in the area between Przemyśl and Rozwadów, the Polish commander had only 10 battalions of infantry, one battalion of engineers and 42 pieces of artillery at his disposal. The central area of the line around Jarosław (between Radymno and Sieniawa was manned by four battalions of infantry and 20 guns under the command of Lieutenant-Colonel Jan Wójcik of the 2nd Legions' Infantry Division. The forces were insufficient to guard the river line, and especially so because the summer of 1939 was uncommonly dry and the level of water in Polish rivers was very low, allowing the armoured forces to cross them by fording.

At the same time, the German 4th Light Division under Major-General Alfred Ritter von Hubicki and the 2nd Panzer Division under Lieutenant-General Rudolf Veiel were approaching the town of Jarosław from the north-west, aiming at crossing the river and cutting off the retreating Kraków Army from the east. During the night of 10 September, the earlier unit moved from the area of Rzeszów through Pruchnik and Zamiechów to Radymno at the San River. In the early morning the Germans took the Polish defenders by surprise and crossed the river, unopposed.

== Defence of Jarosław ==
Around the same time Colonel Stanisław Maczek arrived at Jarosław. His unit, the Polish 10th Motorized Cavalry Brigade, was one of only two fully motorized Polish units and had been used by the commanding officer of the Kraków Army as an armed firefighter, thrown into battle each time the Germans or Slovaks tried to outflank the - much slower - Polish army. This time his unit formed the rear guard of the army and was to provide cover for the units retreating. Maczek decided to station his brigade around Jarosław and strengthen the Polish defences there.

Around noon the two German divisions arrived near Jarosław and the Polish front guards retreated to the other side of the river, leaving only a token infantry force under Colonel Wójcik at the bridgehead on the western banks. Maczek decided to hold the city for one day in order to provide a safe haven for the slower units following his brigade. After that his unit was to continue its pursuit of his army and organize another delaying action further eastwards, near Lwów (modern Lviv, Ukraine).

In the early afternoon the Germans started their assault on the city, but were repelled and forced to leave several damaged or destroyed tanks on the battlefield. The repeated assaults later that day were also unsuccessful. Overnight Colonel Maczek decided that his plan succeeded and further defence of the city could result in his unit being cut out from the rear by the Germans advancing from Radymno. Because of that he moved his unit further eastwards to the Oleszyce-Lubaczów area. Lieutenant-Colonel Wójcik's forces were to hold the town for as long as possible, and then follow the motorized brigade. The Poles blew up the bridges and left only a token force in the city, while the majority of the men retreated under the cover of darkness. In the early morning of 11 September the Germans resumed their assault, this time with a heavy artillery barrage. However, since most of the Polish units were already miles away, the losses were negligible. Around noon the panzers rolled towards the Polish positions only to discover that the several infantry companies (an infantry battalion under Captain Matheis), until then guarding the Polish positions, were also withdrawn.

== See also ==
- List of World War II military equipment of Poland
- List of German military equipment of World War II
