= Battle of Jordanów =

Battle during the Nazi invasion of Poland

Coordinates: 49°38′55″N 19°49′47″E

- Part of Invasion of Poland
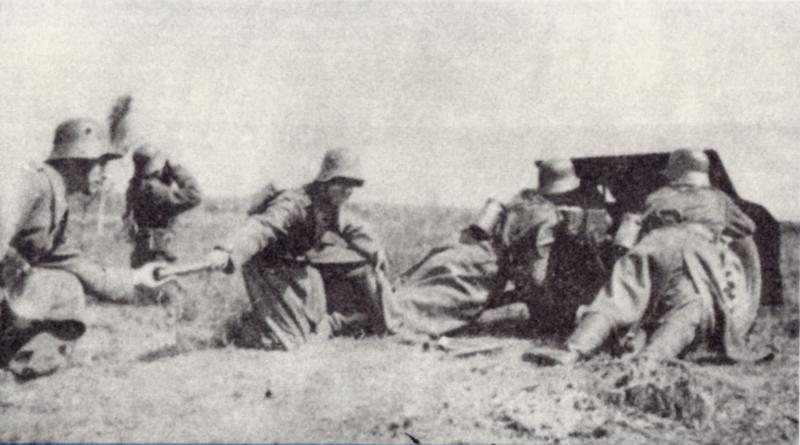
- Soldiers of the 10th Motorized Cavalry Brigade using a Bofors 37mm gun
Date	1–3 September 1939
Location	Jordanów, Kraków Voivodeship, Poland
Result	German victory

Belligerents
Poland	Germany

Commanders and leaders
(Second Polish Republic) Stanisław Maczek (Second Polish Republic) Jan Wójcik	(Nazi Germany) Eugen Beyer

Units involved
(Second Polish Republic) Army Kraków: 10th Motorized Cavalry Brigade; 1st Regiment of KOP; battalion from 12th IR	(Nazi Germany) XVIII Panzer Corps: 2nd Panzer Division; 4th Light Division; 3rd Mountain Division

Strength
5,000 soldiers 58 tanks and AFVs; 16 field guns armoured train No.51 "Pierwszy Marszałek"	3/109 heavy artillery 50,000 soldiers 498 tanks and AFVs; 128 field guns

Casualties and losses
3+ tanks	70+ tanks and AFVs

The Battle of Jordanów took place on 1–3 September 1939, during the Invasion of Poland and the opening stages of World War II. It was fought between the German XVIII Panzer Corps of Gen.E.Beyer and the Polish 10th Motorized Cavalry Brigade under Col. Stanisław Maczek.

== Opening hostilities ==
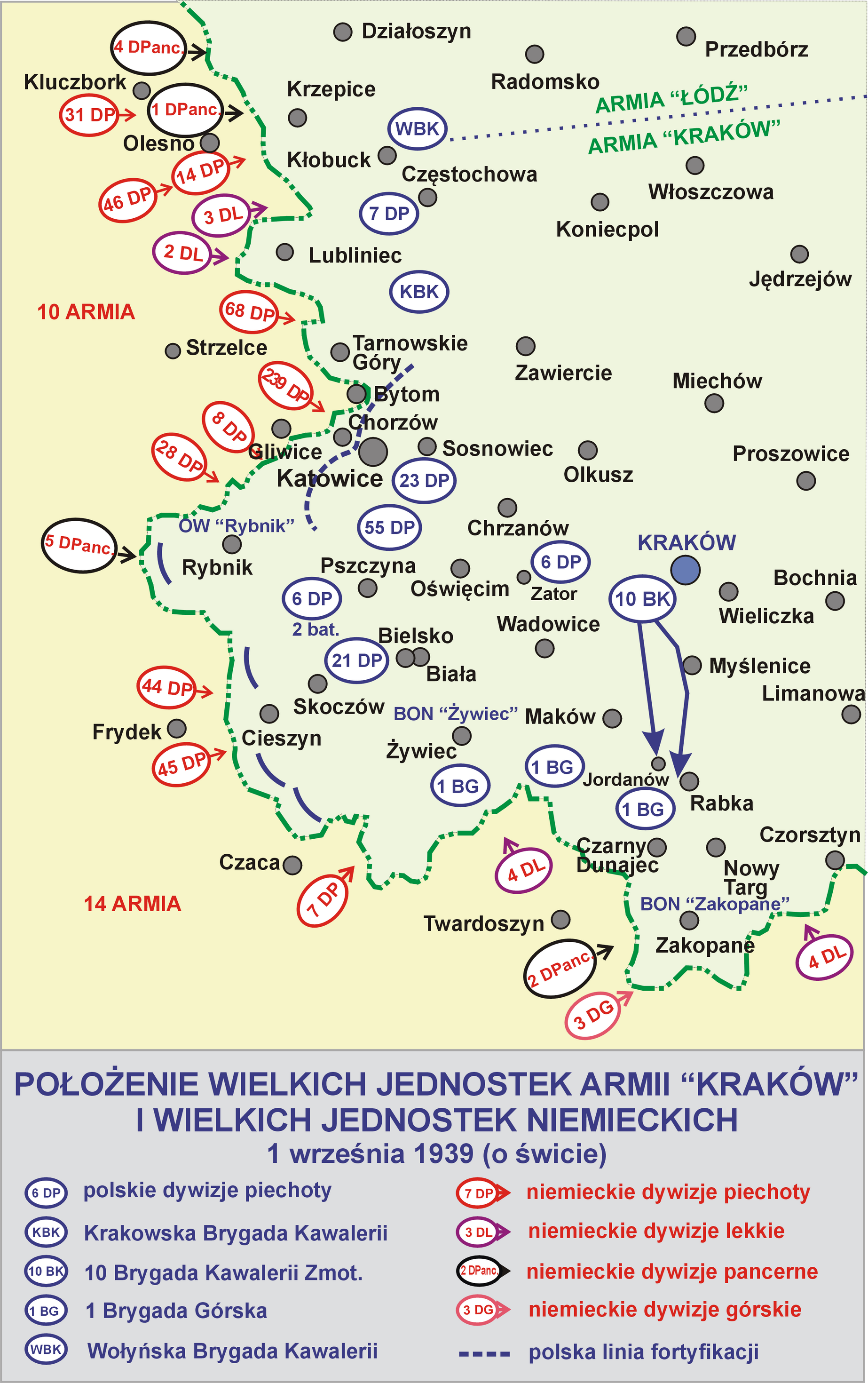
Positions of Polish and German forces before the battle. Map by Lonio17

On 1 September 1939, the XVIII Panzer Corps, part of the German 14th Army, crossed the Polish border from Slovakia. In an attempt to outflank the positions of the Polish Kraków Army under Gen. Antoni Szylling defending Silesia and western Lesser Poland, the Germans crossed the Tatra passes and assaulted the towns of Chabówka and Nowy Targ. Their orders were to seize the town of Myślenice not later than on 3 September thus encircling the entire Polish army fighting in the area.

== Opposing forces ==
The area assaulted by the XVIII Corps was only lightly defended by a single infantry regiment of the Border Defence Corps under Lt.Col. Jan Wójcik. Hard pressed by a combined force of 3rd Mountain Division, 2nd Panzer Division and 4th Light Division under Gen. Alfred Ritter von Hubicki, the Border Defence Corps, aided by the local volunteers and units of the National Defence, withstood the attack, but also suffered heavy losses. Despite stopping the Germans in the vicinity of Nowy Targ, the town was taken by the Germans and the risk of breaking through the Polish lines became apparent.

== Polish counterattack ==
To counter the threat, General Szylling ordered the 10th Motorized Cavalry Brigade, until then held in reserve, to move to the area and block the area of Jordanów and Rabka. Overnight the brigade was transported to the area and Col. Maczek installed his headquarters in the village of Krzeczów. The detachments of the Polish unit entered combat almost instantly. Particularly heavy fights occurred in the hills to the south of Jordanów, around the mountain of Wysoka (not to be confused with the Wysoka in northern Poland), where the 24th Motorized Regiment under Col. Kazimierz Dworzak, aided by the KOP and anti-tank artillery defended the area against the 2nd Panzer Division. Heavy artillery barrage started at 5 AM and soon afterwards the entire division started an all-out assault of the Polish positions. Despite suffering heavy losses, the Poles managed to stop the German assault and by noon the Germans withdrew losing approximately 30 tanks. However, the numerical and technical superiority of the Wehrmacht was tremendous and after three failed assaults, in the late evening the Germans finally seized the mountain of Wysoka and the village at its feet. The Poles withdrew under cover of an armoured train. The village of Wysoka became a centre for German service units and munitions depot. However, during the night the civilian inhabitants set two oil tanks on fire. The explosion destroyed a number of previously damaged tanks of the 2nd division, also killing a number of resting soldiers of the 3rd Mountain Division.

== Losses ==
Altogether, in the battle of Jordanów the Germans lost approximately 50 tanks and a number of other armoured fighting vehicles. Polish losses were also significant, and especially so in the ill-equipped volunteer units.

== Aftermath ==
=== Beskids withdrawal and ambush ===
Having reconed the German units in the area, Gen. Szylling ordered the 10th Cavalry Brigade to slowly withdraw along the Beskids and organize delaying actions along the rivers and mountain ranges. Despite being badly outnumbered, the following day the Polish unit organized an ambush near Lubień and Sucha Beskidzka, in which the German tanks suffered additional losses. The same day the 24th Recce Escadrille composed of 6 PZL.23 Karaś bombers destroyed a number of tanks around Jordanów and the village of Podwilk. The 31st Recce Escadrille, forming part of the organic aviation of the Karpaty Army successfully bombed the tanks of the 4th Light Division on the road between Nowy Targ and Chabówka.

=== Ambushes of Kasina Wielka and Myślenice ===
Afterward, the Poles withdrew again, this time to the area of Kasina Wielka, where two ambushes were organized on 4 September. The following day the Poles followed the road towards Myślenice, where yet another ambush was organized. This tactics proved to be a good weapon against the German blitzkrieg as the Germans in the area could not advance faster than mere 10 to 20 kilometres a day and suffering heavy losses in men and equipment. Because of its success, the 10th Motorized Cavalry Brigade remained a fully operational unit until 19 September 1939, when it was ordered to cross the border with Hungary.

== See also ==
- List of World War II military equipment of Poland
- List of German military equipment of World War II
