= Maczek Memorial Breda =

Museum in The Netherlands

Coordinates: 51°34′55″N 4°44′51″E

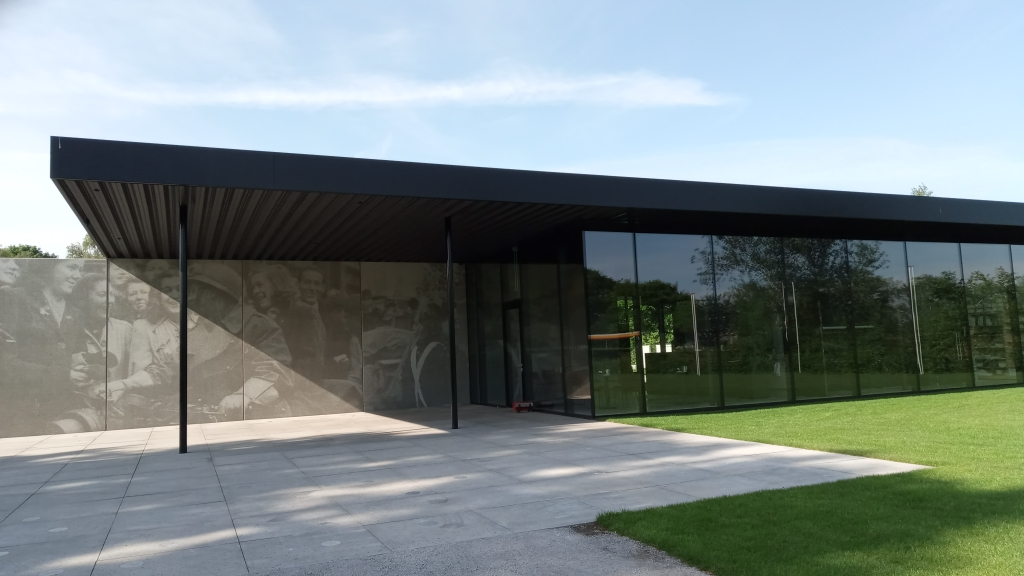
- Museum in 2022
- Established: 2020
- Location: Ettensebaan 17a Breda, Netherlands
- Type: War museum
- Website: maczekmemorialbreda.nl

The Maczek Memorial Breda is a museum in Breda, Noord-Brabant, The Netherlands. It tells the story of the liberation of Breda in 1944 by the First Polish Armoured Division led by General Stanisław Maczek. The museum was opened in 2020.

== The museum ==
=== History ===
The Maczek Memorial Breda originates from the Generaal Maczek Museum, which until 2015 was located in building -R- on the Trip van Zoudtlandtkazerne. The General Maczek Museum was founded on October 27, 1997, and had a large collection of objects related to World War Two and the liberation of Breda.

After it was no longer possible to house the museum in the Trip van Zoudtlandtkazerne, they started looking for a new location. A site was chosen behind the Polish Military Cemetery on the Ettensebaan in Breda.

=== Opening ===
On 27 May 2019 construction on the Maczek Memorial started. The opening was scheduled for March 31, 2020, the birthday of General Maczek. This could not take place due to the corona crisis. The official opening was therefore moved to 24 October 2020, close the commemoration day of the liberation of Breda.

=== Collection and building ===
The permanent collection of the Maczek Memorial Breda includes the original uniform of General Maczek, which was donated by his children. Various original weapons and items from the Second World War are also on display. In addition, the Memorial houses an information and documentation center and a Chambre de Reflection.
