= Jordanów =

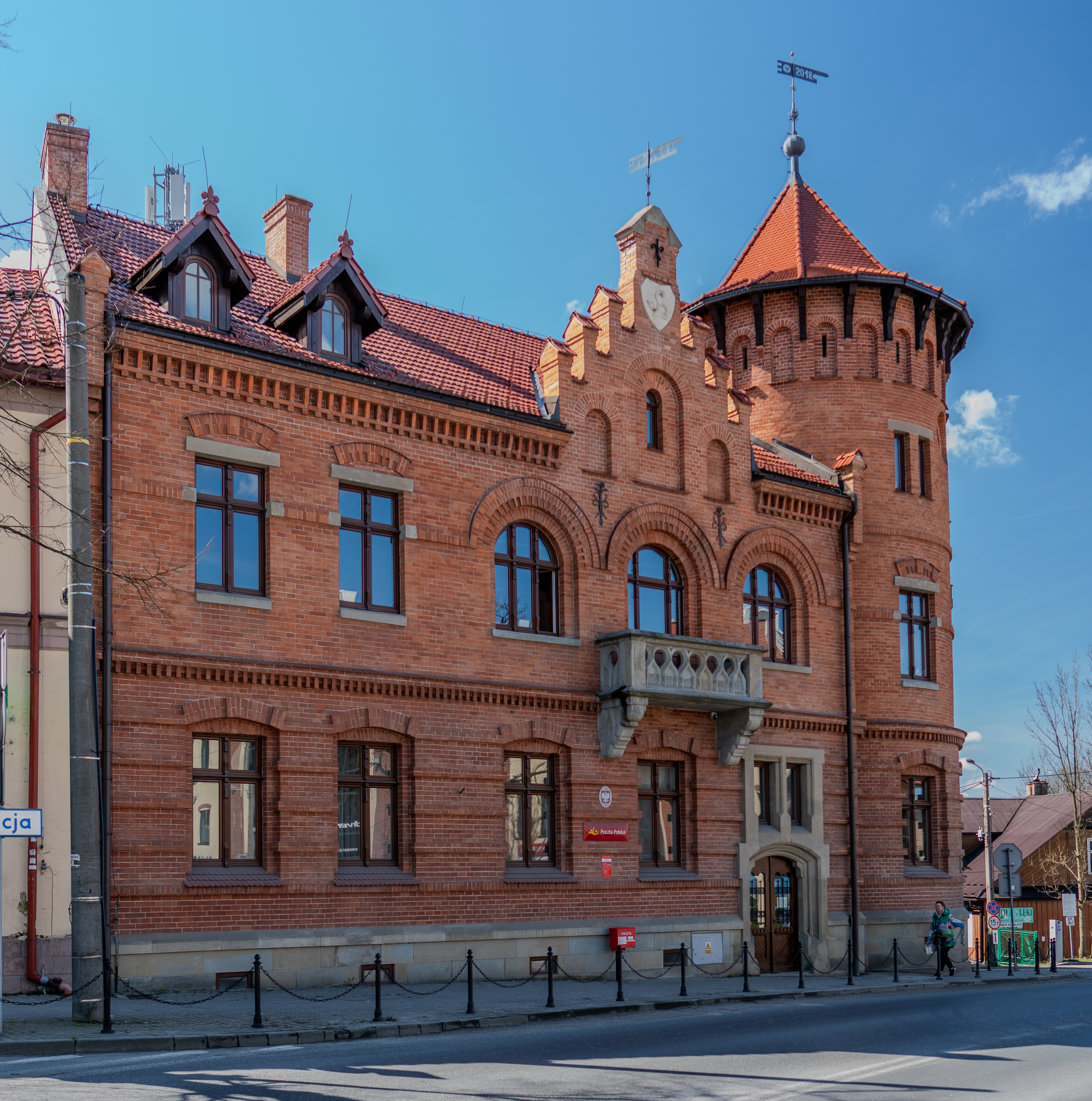
- Post office in Jordanów

- Coat of arms

- Location within Poland
- Coordinates: 49°40′N 19°50′E
- Country: Poland
- Voivodeship: Lesser Poland
- County: Sucha
- Gmina: Jordanów (urban gmina)
- Established: 1564
- Town rights: 1564

Government
  - Mayor: Andrzej Malczewski

Area
  - Total: 21.03 km^{2} (8.12 sq mi)

Population (2010)
  - Total: 5,234
  - Density: 248.9/km^{2} (644.6/sq mi)
- Time zone: UTC+1 (CET)
  - Summer (DST): UTC+2 (CEST)
- Postal code: 34–240
- Area code: +48 18
- Car plates: KSU
- Climate: Dfb
- Website: http://www.jordanow.pl/

Jordanów, is a town in the Lesser Poland Voivodeship, in southern Poland, on the Skawa river. As of 2018, the town had a population of 5,360.

== History ==
Jordanów was founded in 1564 by Spytek Wawrzyniec Jordan on the salt road from Kraków and Wieliczka to Orava and Hungary. In 1581 it got a right to organize annual fairs, which in 17th century became famous in south regions of the Crown. Main goods traded there were linen, cattle and salt. Since 1999, Jordanów has been situated in Sucha County, Lesser Poland Voivodeship. It was previously in Nowy Sącz Voivodeship from 1975 to 1998.

Jordanów is the oldest town on the territory of Sucha Beskidzka County. Its history dates back to a royal privilege, issued in 1564 by King Zygmunt August, upon which Spytek Jordan of Zakliczyn was allowed to found a new town. Jordan himself was a rich and influential nobleman, a starosta of Kraków and Crown podskarbi.

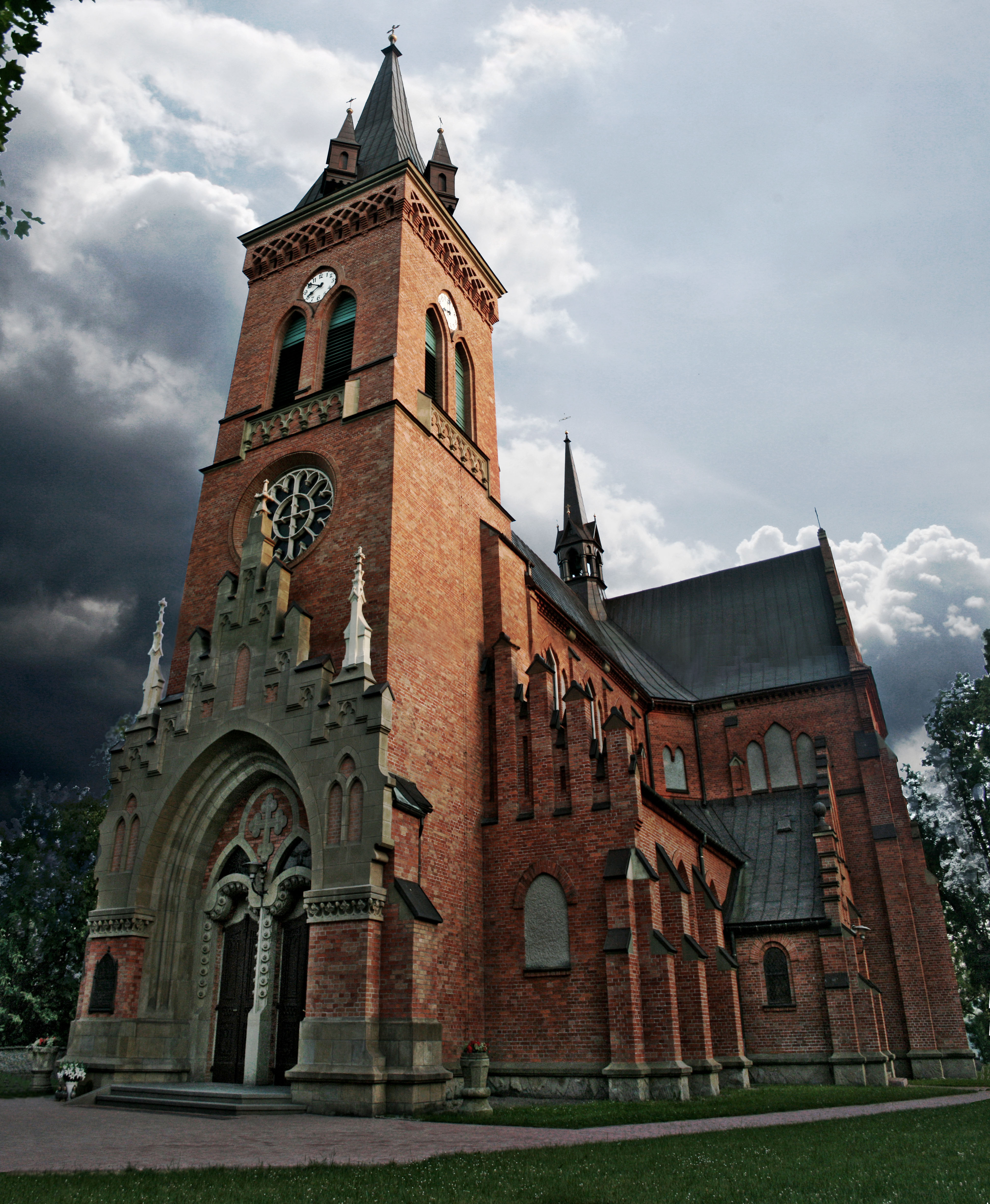
Parish Church of the Holy Trinity in Jordanów

The town of Jordanów was located on the grounds of the village of Malejowa, with Magdeburg rights charter. Spytek Jordan, who was regarded as an enlightened man, planned the town square with a town hall (1571), hoping that Jordanów would emerge as an important trade and craft center. After Spytko's death, Jordanów belonged to his wife Anna Sieniawska, and then to several noble families. In 1576, Stefan Batory confirmed Jordanów's charter, allowing for two fairs a year. Jordanów prospered, with inns, restaurants, artisans, and warehouses of salt and Hungarian wine, a very popular commodity in the Polish–Lithuanian Commonwealth.

Following the First Partition of Poland (1772) Jordanów was annexed by the Habsburg Empire, and remained in Austrian Galicia until 1918. During Austrian rule the town declined, with the situation slowly improving after 1884, when a railroad line with a station was completed. In the Second Polish Republic, Jordanów was a spa, nicknamed Green Town. The town, however, remained poor, with high unemployment and no industry.

In early September 1939, during the Invasion of Poland, Jordanów was burned by the Wehrmacht (see also Battle of Jordanów). Out of 400 houses, 270 were completely destroyed. The town was once again burned in January 1945, and for its sufferings, in 1984 was awarded the Order of the Cross of Grunwald.
