= Alfred Ritter von Hubicki =

Hungarian-born German general (1887–1971)

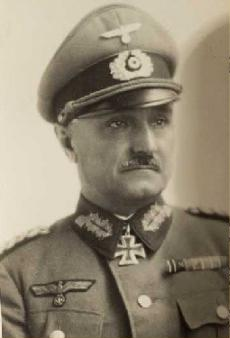
- General Dr. jur. Ritter von Hubicki
- Born: 5 February 1887; Friedrichsdorf, Bereg County, Austria-Hungary
- Died: 14 July 1971 (aged 84); Vienna, Republic of Austria
- Relatives: ∞ 19 August 1916 Thyra von Hoffinger; 2 daughters
- Military career
- Allegiance: (Austria-Hungary) Austria–Hungary; Republic of German-Austria; (Austria) First Austrian Republic; Nazi Germany
- Branch: Austro-Hungarian Army; German-Austrian People's Militia; Bundesheer; Army (Wehrmacht)
- Service years: 1905–1938; 1938–1945
- Rank: Generalmajor; General der Panzertruppe
- Commands: 9th Panzer Division; LXXXIX Army Corps
- Conflicts: World War I; World War II; Poland Campaign; Western Campaign; Balkans Campaign; Operation Barbarossa
- Awards: Knight's Cross of the Iron Cross
- Other work: Jurist

Alfred Eduard Franz Ritter von Hubicki (5 February 1887 – 14 July 1971) was a Hungarian-born general in the Wehrmacht of Nazi Germany during World War II.

== Military career ==
By the time of the Anschluss of Austria in 1938 he had reached the rank of Generalmajor as the commander of the Austrian Army motorized division and transferred to the Wehrmacht with the same rank and was appointed commander of the 4th Light Division upon its formation in Vienna. The unit was renamed the 9th Panzer Division and Hubicki commanded it through the invasion of Poland in which it took part in the Battle of Jordanów and Battle of Jaroslaw. It then took part in the invasions of France and The Netherlands and Hubicki was promoted to Generalleutnant in August 1940. He then led the division in the Balkans and was awarded the Knight's Cross of the Iron Cross for his role in that campaign.

He was promoted to General der Panzertruppe on 1 October 1942 and after commanding a special unit at the OKW he was appointed as German General at the Slovak Ministry of Defence and Chief of the German Army Mission in Slovakia (1 August 1944 to 1 October 1944). He was retired from active service in March 1945 and died in 1971.

== Promotions ==
- 18 August 1905 Kadett-Offizierstellvertreter (Cadet Deputy Officer)
  - In 1908, the rank of "Cadet Deputy Officer" in the Austro-Hungarian Army was officially renamed "Fähnrich," following the German model.
- 1 November 1907 Leutnant (2nd Lieutenant)
- 1 November 1912 Oberleutnant (1st Lieutenant)
- 1 July 1915 Hauptmann i. G. (Captain in General Staff)
- 1 July 1920 Titular-Major (Honorary/Brevet Major)
  - 1 July 1920 to 30 September 1923 Law studies at the University of Vienna; obtaining the degree of Dr. iur. (Doctor of Laws) after passing the three rigorous oral examinations (Rigorosa).
- 1 January 1921 Titular-Oberstleutnant a. D. (Honorary/Brevet Lieutenant Colonel, Ret.)
- 1 October 1923 Oberstleutnant (active Lieutenant Colonel)
- 22 February 1930 Oberst i. G. (Colonel in General Staff)
- 24 December 1935 Generalmajor (Major General)

=== Wehrmacht ===
- 14 March 1938 Generalmajor (Major General) with effect from 13 March 1938 but without RDA
  - 31 May 1939 received Rank Seniority (RDA) from 1 October 1938 (12)
- 14 August 1940 Generalleutnant (Lieutenant General) with effect from 1 August 1940 and RDA from 1 April 1940 (12)
- 2 October 1942 General der Panzertruppe with effect and RDA from 1 October 1942
  - 16 October 1942 received ordinal number (Ordnungsnummer) "1b" to his RDA from 1 October 1942

== Awards and decorations ==
- Military Jubilee Cross for the armed forces on 2 December 1908
- Imperial Chinese Medal of Merit (often also referred to as the Chinese Medal of Merit for Foreigners) in Gold in April 1910
- Austro-Hungarian Military Merit Medal (Signum Laudis) in Bronze on the ribbon of the Military Merit Cross (ribbon for wartime merit) on 14 January 1915
  - When the "swords" were introduced on 13 December 1916, he was subsequently awarded this distinction.
- Austro-Hungarian Military Merit Medal (Signum Laudis) in Silver on the ribbon of the Military Merit Cross (ribbon for wartime merit) on 27 July 1915
  - When the "swords" were introduced on 13 December 1916, he was subsequently awarded this distinction.
- Military Merit Cross (Austria-Hungary), III. Class with War Decoration (ÖM3K) on 7 October 1916
  - When the "swords" were introduced to the war decoration on 13 December 1916, he was subsequently awarded this distinction (ÖM3KX).
- Order of the Iron Crown (Austria), Knight III. Class with War Decoration and Swords (ÖEK3KX) on 9 November 1917
- Military Merit Cross (Austria-Hungary), 3rd Class with the War Decoration and Swords (ÖM3KX); 2nd time awarded
- Order of the Württemberg Crown, Knight's Cross with Swords (WK3X)
- Austrian War Commemorative Medal with Swords on 19 June 1933
- Golden Decoration of Merit of the Republic of Austria on 23 December 1933
- Military Service Badge (Austria) for Officers, 2nd Class (for 25 years) on 31 October 1934
- Hungarian Order of Merit, Commander's Cross with Star on 29 November 1936
- Wehrmacht Long Service Award, 4th to 1st Class (25-year Service Cross)
- Honour Cross of the World War 1914/1918 with Swords
- Sudetenland Medal
- Iron Cross (1939), 2nd and 1st Class
  - 2nd Class on 18 September 1939
  - 1st Class on 23 September 1939
- Knight's Cross of the Iron Cross on 20 April 1941
- Order of Military Merit (Bulgaria), Grand Cross with the War Decoration in August 1941
- German Cross in Gold on 22 April 1942
- Winter Battle in the East 1941–42 Medal on 9 September 1942

== Sources ==
- German Federal Archives: BArch PERS 6/203 and PERS 6/299912

Military offices
Preceded by —	Commander of 9th Panzer Division; 3 January 1940 – 14 April 1942	Succeeded by Generalleutnant Johannes Baeßler
Preceded by None	Commander of LXXXIX. Armeekorps; 2 August 1942 – 18 December 1942	Succeeded by Generalleutnant Hugo Höfl
Preceded by Generalleutnant Hugo Höfl	Commander of LXXXIX. Armeekorps; 30 April 1943 – 11 June 1943	Succeeded by General der Infanterie Werner von Gilsa
