= National Defense (Poland) =

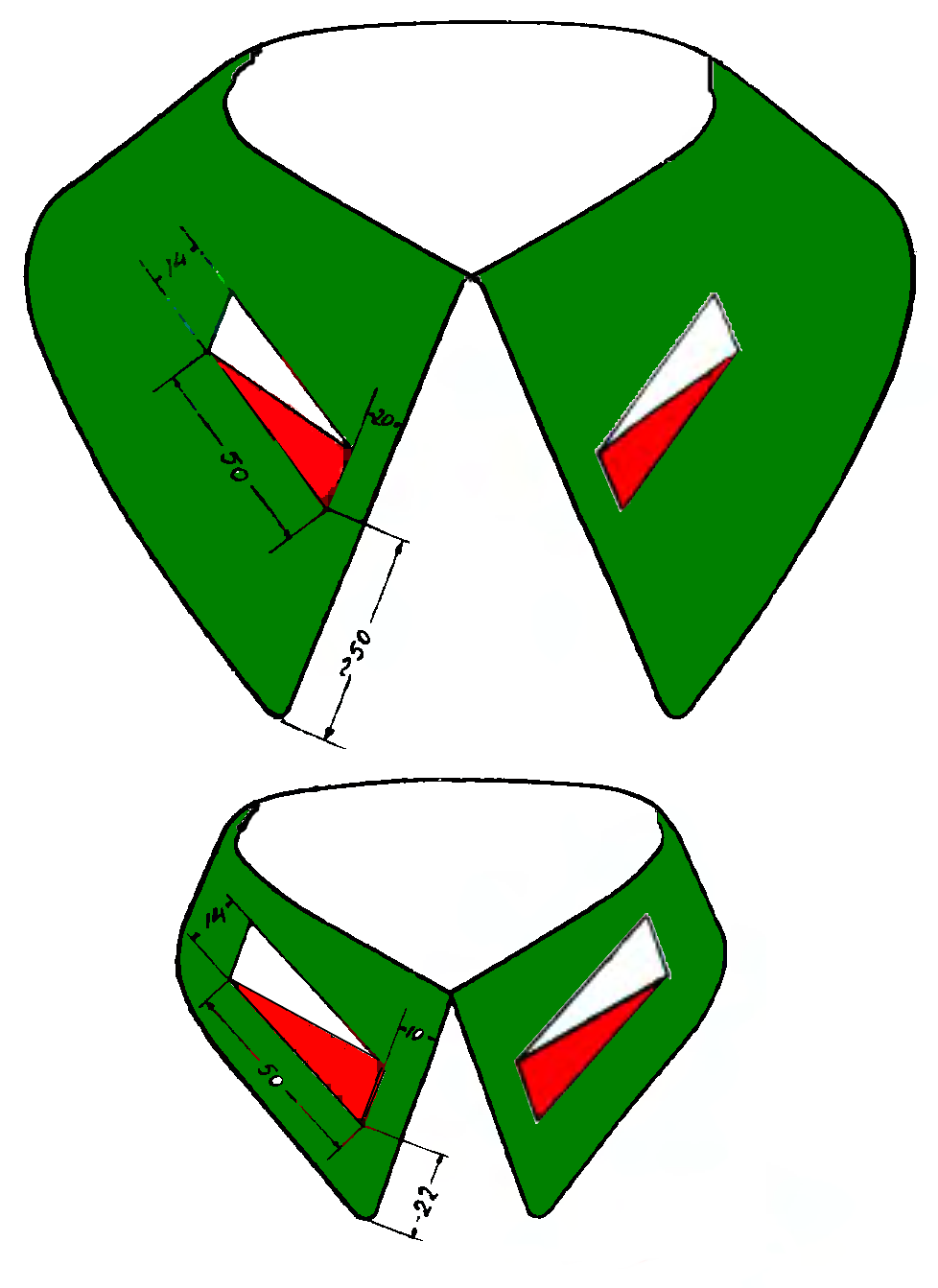
National Defense - Uniform pennants

National Defense (Polish: Obrona Narodowa, ON) was a volunteer military formation of the Second Polish Republic.

Its units (brigades and demi-brigades, divided into battalions) were subordinated to various Polish corps and armies.

National Defense is most commonly referred through its units (brigades - sing. Brygada Obrony Narodowej (Brygada ON) or battalions - sing. Batalion Obrony Narodowej (Batalion ON); the units were also named by the geographical region they were related to, and if more than one was formed, by Roman numerals, ex. Batalion ON "Lwów II")

National Defense units were composed of volunteers, some reservists and unemployed. They were equipped with second-grade weaponry, and their goal was to support defensive operations of the regular Polish Army. National Defense was created by an order of the Polish Ministry of Military Affairs on 5 December 1936; the brigades begun to be formed in 1937.

During the German invasion of Poland in 1939, National Defense mobilized 83 battalions (approximately 1,600 officers and 50,000 soldiers).

== Brigades ==
I DOK: Warszawska Brygada Obrony Narodowej (Warsaw Brigade of National Defense)

II DOK: Wołyńska Półbrygada Obrony Narodowej (Volhynian Demi-Brigade of National Defense)

III DOK: Dziśnieńska Półbrygada Obrony Narodowej (Dzisna Half-Brigade of National Defense)

IV DOK: Sieradzka Brygada Obrony Narodowej (Sieradz Brigade of National Defense)

V DOK: Dąbrowska Brygada Obrony Narodowej, Górnośląska Brygada Obrony Narodowej, Podhalańska Brygada Obrony Narodowej, Śląsko-Cieszyńska Brygada Obrony Narodowej (Dąbrowa Górnicza Brigade of National Defense, Upper Silesian Brigade of National Defense, Podhale Brigade of National Defense, Cieszyn Silesia Brigade of National Defense)

VI DOK: Lwowska Brygada Obrony Narodowej, Tarnopolska Półbrygada Obrony Narodowej (Lwów Brigade of National Defense, Tarnopol Half-Brigade of National Defense)

VII DOK: Poznańska Brygada Obrony Narodowej, Kaliska Brygada Obrony Narodowej (Poznań Brigade of National Defense, Kalisz Brigade of National Defense)

VIII DOK: Chełmińska Brygada Obrony Narodowej, Morska Brygada Obrony Narodowej, Pomorska Brygada Obrony Narodowej (Chełmno Brigade of National Defense, Sea Brigade of National Defense, Pomorze Brigade of National Defense)

X DOK: Karpacka Brygada Obrony Narodowej, Podkarpacka Brygada Obrony Narodowej (Carpathian Brigade of National Defense, Subcarpathian Brigade of National Defense)

Brigades: Chełmińska Brygada ON • Cieszyńska Brygada ON • Dąbrowska Brygada ON • Kaliska Brygada ON • Karpacka Brygada ON • Lwowska Brygada ON • Morska Brygada ON • Podhalańska Brygada ON • Podkarpacka Brygada ON • Pomorska Brygada ON • Poznańska Brygada ON • Sieradzka Brygada ON • Śląska Brygada ON • Warszawska Brygada ON

Battalions: Bielsko • Brodnica • Brzozów • Bydgoszcz • Chełm • Chrzanów • Cieszyn I • Cieszyn II • Czersk • Dąbrowa Górnicza • Gdynia I • Gdynia II • Gdynia III • Grudziądz • Huculski I • Huculski II • Jabłonowo • Jarosław • Jasło • Kartuzy IV • Kaszuby V • Katowice • Kcynia • Kępno • Kłobuck • Koronowo • Kościan • Kościerzyna • Kowel • Koźmin • Krosno • Krotoszyn • Leszno • Limanowa • Lubliniec • Lwów I • Lwów II • Łuck • Mazurski I • Mazurski II • Nakło • Nowy Sącz • Oborniki • Olkusz • Opalenica • Ostrów • Ostrzeszów • Oświęcim • Poznań I • Poznań II • Przemyśl • Rawicz • Rybnik • Rzeszów • Sambor • Sanok • Sosnowiec • Stanisławów • Starogard • Stry • Szamotuły • Świecie • Tarnowskie Góry • Tuchola • Turka • Warszawski I • Warszawski II • Warszawski III • Wągrowiec • Wieluń I • Wieluń II • Zakopane • Zawiercie • Żnin • Żywiec

== See also ==
- Polish army order of battle in 1939
