= 1995 in art =

Events from the year 1995 in art.

== Events ==
- January – New San Francisco Museum of Modern Art, designed by Mario Botta, opens.
- June – Narendra Patel's sculpture Jantar-Mantar, on the campus of the University of Wisconsin–Milwaukee (UWM) on the east side of Milwaukee, Wisconsin., is dedicated.
- November 28 – Barcelona Museum of Contemporary Art, designed by Richard Meier, opens.

== Exhibitions ==
- October 22 – Brilliant!, an exhibition by the Young British Artists group (who also feature heavily in this year’s British Art Show), opens at the Walker Art Center, Minneapolis, USA.

== Works ==
- Larry D. Alexander – Clinton Family Portrait
- Ilan Averbuch – Little Prince (sculpture, Portland, Oregon)
- Christo and Jeanne Claude - "Wrapped Reichstag" in Berlin, Germany
- Tracey Emin – Everyone I Have Ever Slept With 1963–1995 ("The Tent")
- Helen Frankenthaler - Cassis
- Lucian Freud – Benefits Supervisor Sleeping
- Antony Gormley – Havmannen (sculpture)
- Marcus Harvey – Myra
- Philip Jackson (sculptor)
  - Dolphin Group
  - Jersey Liberation Memorial
  - Maggie Reading
- Rachel Joynt and Remco de Fouw – Perpetual Motion (sculpture, Naas by-pass, Ireland)
- Nabil Kanso – series
  - The Raven
- Andrzej Kiciński and Jerzy Sikorski - 1st Armoured Division Memorial (sculpture, Warsaw, Poland)
- Yue Minjun - Execution
- Sir Eduardo Paolozzi – Newton (sculpture)
- Cornelia Parker – Embryo Firearms (preempted objects)
- Cornelia Parker and Tilda Swinton – The Maybe (performance piece)
- Nari Ward - Peace Keeper

== Awards ==
- Archibald Prize – William Robinson, Self-portrait with stunned mullet
- John Moores Painting Prize - David Leapman for "Double-Tongued Knowability
- Schock Prize in Visual Arts – Claes Oldenburg
- Turner Prize – Damien Hirst (Mona Hatoum, Callum Innes, and Mark Wallinger were shortlisted).

The Venice Biennial

- The Golden Lion for best Pavilion : Akram El-Magdoub, Hamdi Attia, Medhat Shafik, and Khaled Shokry representing Egypt

== Deaths ==
=== January to June ===
- February – Robert Stewart, Scottish textile designer (b. 1924)
- March 18 – Robin Jacques, English illustrator (b. 1920)
- April 1 – Dame Lucie Rie, Austrian-born British studio potter (b. 1902)
- April 3 – Lang Jingshan, Chinese photographer (b. 1892)
- April 15 – Harry Shoulberg, American expressionist painter (b. 1903)
- April 24 – Lodewijk Bruckman, Dutch magic realist painter (b. 1903)
- May 26 – Friz Freleng, American animator, cartoonist, director and producer (b. 1906)
- May 30 – William McVey, American sculptor (b. 1905)
- June 22 - Al Hansen, American artist (b. 1927)

=== July to December ===
- July 4 – Bob Ross, American painter and television presenter (b.1942)
- July 24 – George Rodger, English photographer (b.1908)
- August 23 – Alfred Eisenstaedt, German American photographer (b.1898)
- August 28 – Carl Giles, English cartoonist (b.1916)
- September 3 – Mary Adshead, English painter (b.1904)
- October 21
  - Jesús Blasco, Spanish comic book author and artist (b.1919)
  - Nancy Graves, American sculptor, painter and printmaker (b.1939)
- October 26 – Wilhelm Freddie, Danish painter and sculptor (b.1909).
- date unknown
  - Jean-Yves Couliou, French painter (b.1916)
  - Stevan Knežević, Serbian painter, sculptor and professor of art (b.1940)
