= Terra Incognita (sculpture) =

Sculpture in Portland, Oregon

- The sculpture in 2015
- Artist: Ilan Averbuch
- Year: 1995
- Type: Sculpture
- Medium: Steel; wood; stone; copper
- Dimensions: 4.6 m × 12 m × 1.8 m (15 ft × 40 ft × 6 ft)
- Location: Portland, Oregon, United States; 45°31′59″N 122°40′16″W
- Owner: City of Portland and Multnomah County Public Art Collection courtesy of the Regional Arts & Culture Council

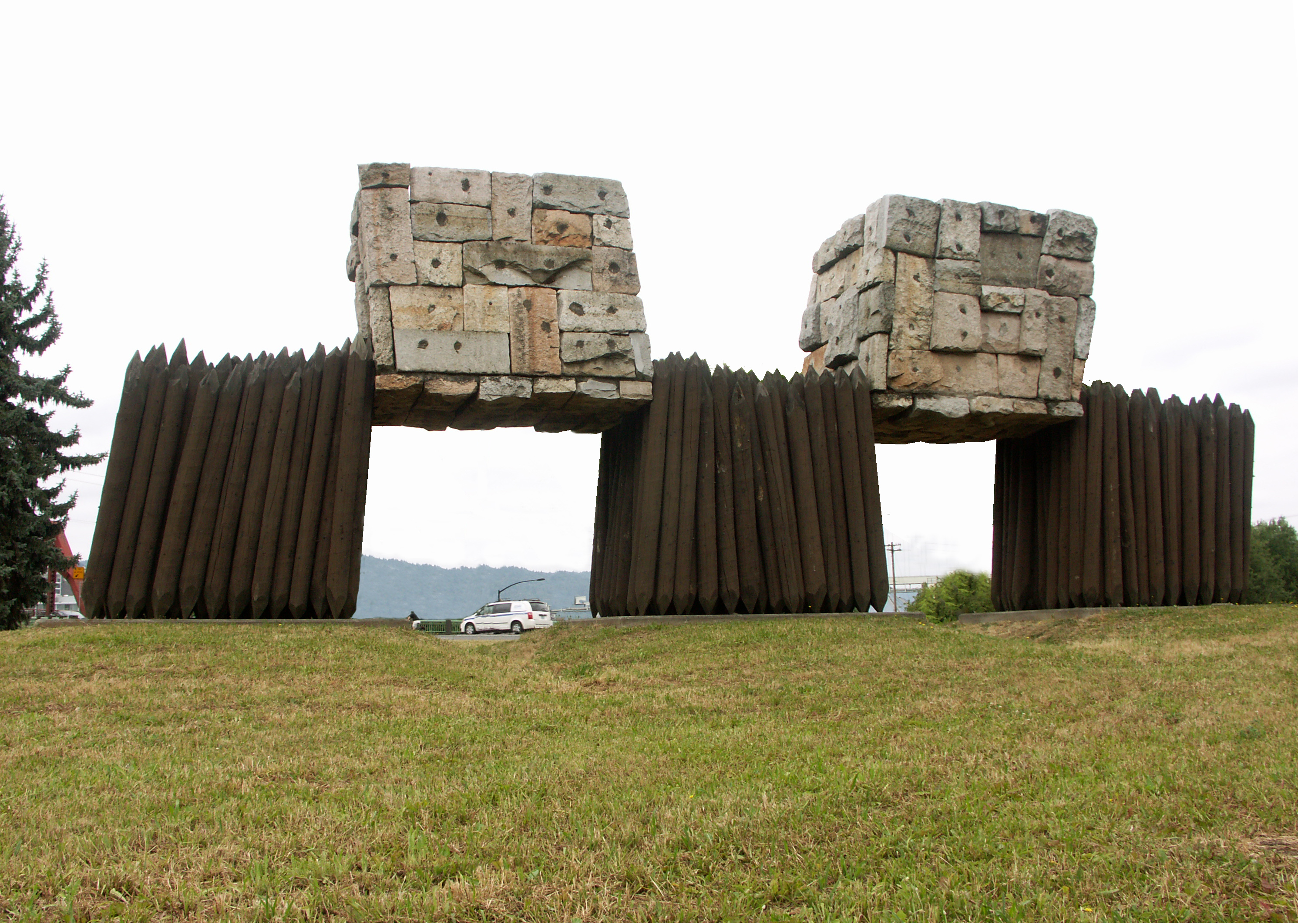
The sculpture in 2009

Terra Incognita is an outdoor 1995 sculpture by Israeli artist Ilan Averbuch, located at the foot of the Broadway Bridge in Portland, Oregon.

== Description and history ==
Terra Incognita, designed by Ilan Averbuch, was installed at North Broadway and North Larrabee Avenue, at the foot of the Broadway Bridge, in Portland's Rose Quarter in 1995. The gate-like sculpture is made from steel, wood, stone and copper, and measures 15 feet (4.6 m) x 40 feet (12 m) x 6 feet (1.8 m). It forms five cubes in a "strong positive negative pattern". The three base cubes are bundled tree trunks, and the two cubes suspended by the lower three are stone piles. According to the Regional Arts & Culture Council, which administer the sculpture:

This work relates to its site in a broad context. It plays off the power of the natural landscape, the rivers, hillsides and mountains, as well as the power and scale of the man-made elements such as surrounding bridges and buildings. Averbuch felt that the dramatic relationship between wood and stone are appropriate for Portland. This sculpture has a feeling of fortification and frontier, elements the artist associates with Oregon.

It is part of the City of Portland and Multnomah County Public Art Collection courtesy of the Regional Arts & Culture Council.

== See also ==
- 1995 in art
- Little Prince (sculpture), another 1995 sculpture by Averbuch located in the Rose Quarter
