= Little Prince (sculpture) =

Sculpture in Portland, Oregon

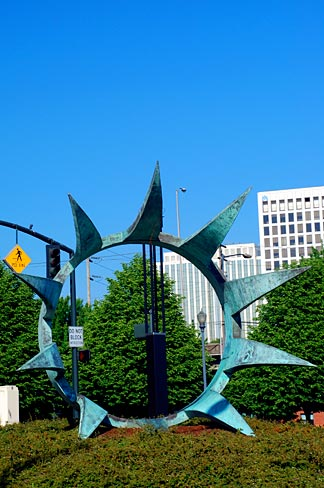
- The sculpture in 2008
- Artist: Ilan Averbuch
- Year: 1995
- Type: Sculpture
- Medium: Copper, steel
- Subject: Crown
- Dimensions: 4.6 m × 5.2 m × 3.7 m (15 ft × 17 ft × 12 ft)
- Location: Portland, Oregon, United States; 45°31′49″N 122°40′00″W
- Owner: City of Portland and Multnomah County Public Art Collection courtesy of the Regional Arts & Culture Council

Little Prince, also known as The Little Prince, is an outdoor 1995 copper and steel sculpture created by artist Ilan Averbuch, located in the Rose Quarter of Portland, Oregon. It is part of the City of Portland and Multnomah County Public Art Collection, courtesy of the Regional Arts & Culture Council.

== Description and history ==
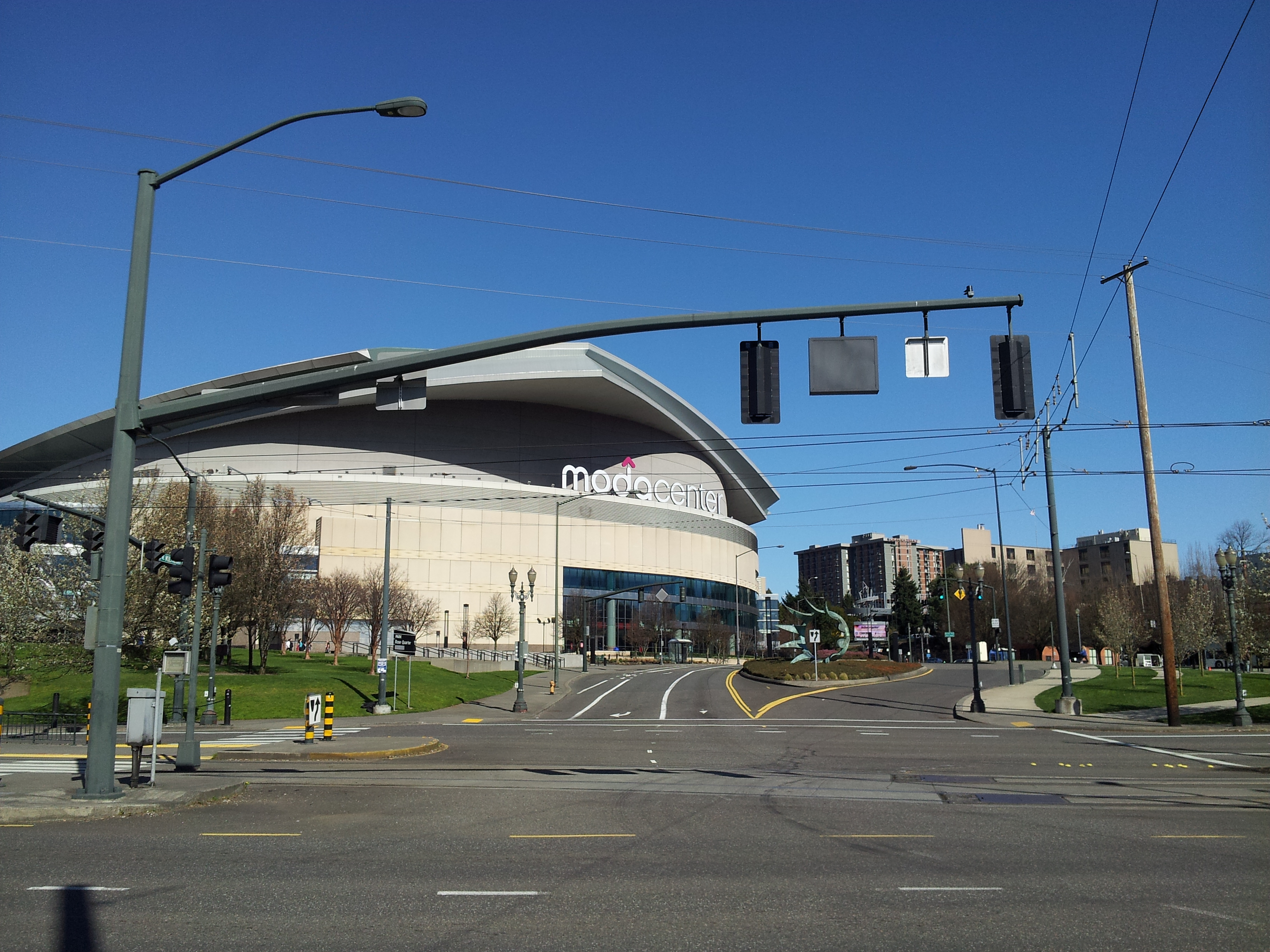
The sculpture in front of the Moda Center, 2015

The copper and steel sculpture of a crown resting on its side was installed in 1995 at the intersection of Northeast Multnomah Street and North Interstate Avenue, south of the Moda Center in Portland's Rose Quarter. Funded by the City of Portland's Percent for Art program, the crown measures 15 feet (4.6 m) x 17 feet (5.2 m) x 12 feet (3.7 m) and is partially buried.

According to the Regional Arts & Culture Council, the agency which administers the sculpture, "It is a piece about imagination, desires and aspirations, conquests and struggles. It is the job of the viewer to create the story that goes along with the crown. Is it a victory and position of honor waiting to be claimed, or is there another story? Only the viewer can say." Save Outdoor Sculpture! suggested, "The crown is resting on its side perhaps waiting as a prize to be claimed or as a symbol of a triumph to come." Averbuch was inspired by Antoine de Saint-Exupéry's novella The Little Prince (1943), particularly its first chapter where the main character talks about his drawing of a boa constrictor swallowing an elephant being mistaken for a hat.

The sculpture is part of the City of Portland and Multnomah County Public Art Collection courtesy of the Regional Arts & Culture Council.

== See also ==
- 1995 in art
- Terra Incognita (sculpture), another 1995 sculpture by Averbuch located in the Rose Quarter
