= Invalids Square =

Urban square in Warsaw, Poland

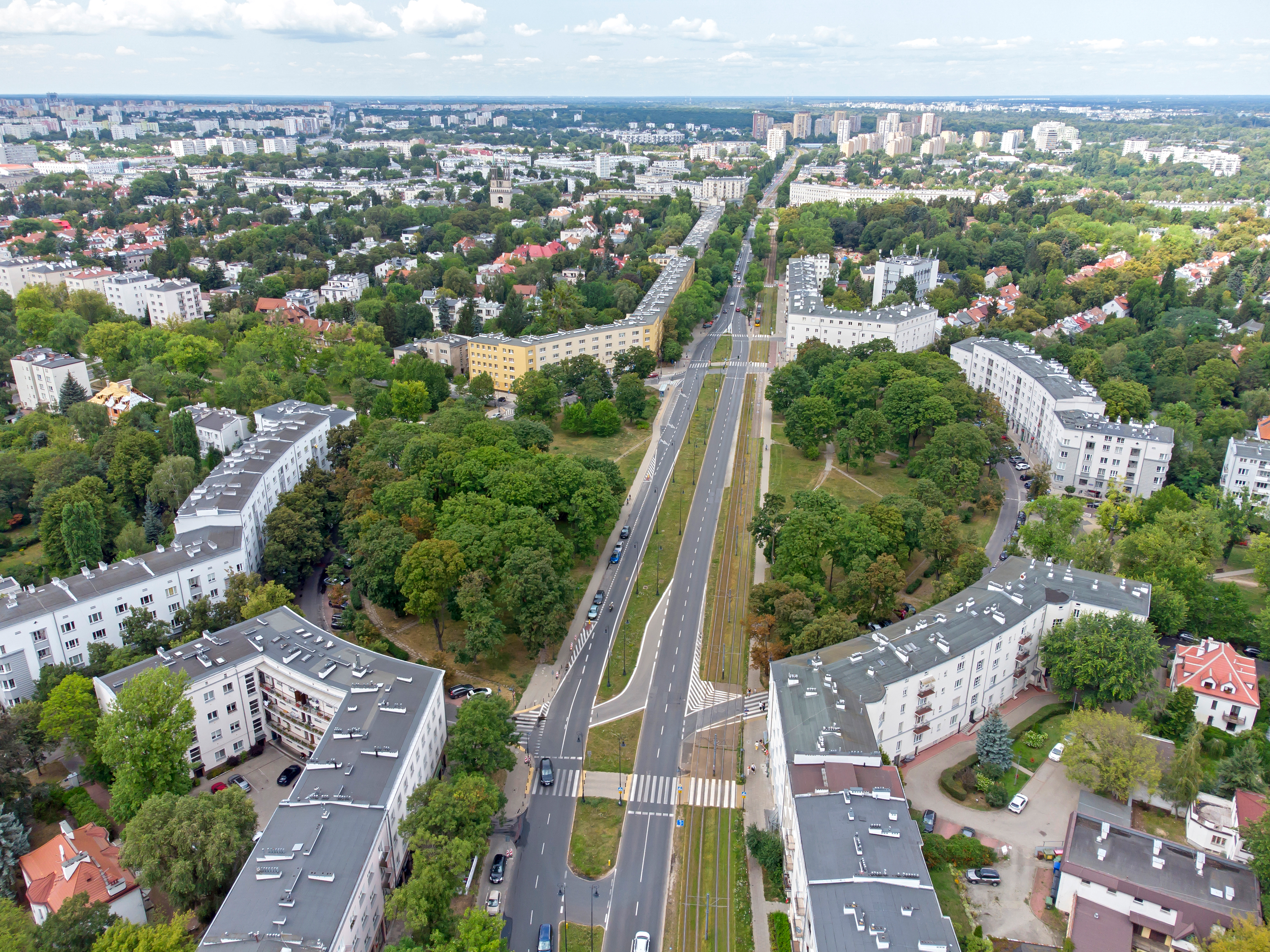
- Invalids Square in 2024

- Location within Warsaw
- Type: Urban square
- Location: Żoliborz, Warsaw, Poland
- Coordinates: 52°15′50″N 20°59′26″E
- North: Czarnieckiego Street; Mickiewicza Street
- East: Wojska Polskiego Avenue
- South: Czarnieckiego Street; Mickiewicza Street
- West: Wojska Polskiego Avenue

Construction
- Completion: 20 December 1924

The Invalids Square (Polish: Plac Inwalidów) is an urban square and traffic circle in Warsaw, Poland, within the Żoliborz district. It is located at the intersection of Czarnieckiego Street, Mickiewicza Street, and Wojska Polskiego Avenue. The square was opened in 2024.

== History ==
Between 1863 and 1864, in the location of the current square, the Imperial Russian Army had constructed Georgy Fort, as part of the fortifications of Warsaw Citadel. It was made from bricks and dirt, and had a circular shape. The construction was concerned to the Citadel via a tunnel, which survives to the present day. The fort was demolished in the early 1920s.

In its place, in 1923, a large urban square was constructed, at the intersection of Czarnieckiego Street, Mickiewicza Street, and Wojska Polskiego Avenue. A tram line was also constructed, going along Mickiewicza Street. It was opened on 20 December 1924, and on 27 September 1926, it was named Invalids Square, to honour people that became disabled during the First World War.

In the 1920s and 1930s, around the square, multifamily residential buildings of the Officers Housing Association and the Warsaw Housing Association were considered. During the German occupation in the Second World War, two Ringstand 58c small military bunkers were placed at the square. The buildings around the square survived the conflict undamaged.

On 30 September 1995, at the square, the 1st Armoured Division Monument, designed by sculptor Jerzy Sikorski and architect Andrzej Kiciński, was unveiled. It is dedicated to the 1st Armoured Division of the Polish Armed Forces during the Second World War.

On 23 September 2017, the monument dedicated to Stanisław Sosabowski, general and leader of the 1st Independent Parachute Brigade of the Polish Armed Forces during the Second World War, was also unveiled. It was made by Martin Abspoel.

== Characteristics ==
The Invalids Square is crisscrossed by Mickiewicza Street and a tram line. Its outer boundary forms a traffic circle intersecting Czarnieckiego Street, Mickiewicza Street, and Wojska Polskiego Avenue. It is covered by a large lawn and greenery. Around it, there are multifamily residential buildings dating from the 1920s and 1930s. Among them is the historical former Officer Hotel, at number 10. It was designed by Romuald Gutt and connected between 1922 and 1925.

At the square, there is the 1st Armoured Division Monument, designed by sculptor Jerzy Sikorski and architect Andrzej Kiciński, and unveiled in 1995. It consists of a column with a sculpture of an eagle on its side, as well as a sculpture of the helmet and wings of a Polish hussar and a part of a tank tread, placed on top.

There is also the monument dedicated to Stanisław Sosabowski, general and leader of the 1st Independent Parachute Brigade of the Polish Armed Forces during the Second World War. It was designed by Martin Abspoel and unveiled in 2017. It is a bust depicting Sosabowski.

== Gallery ==
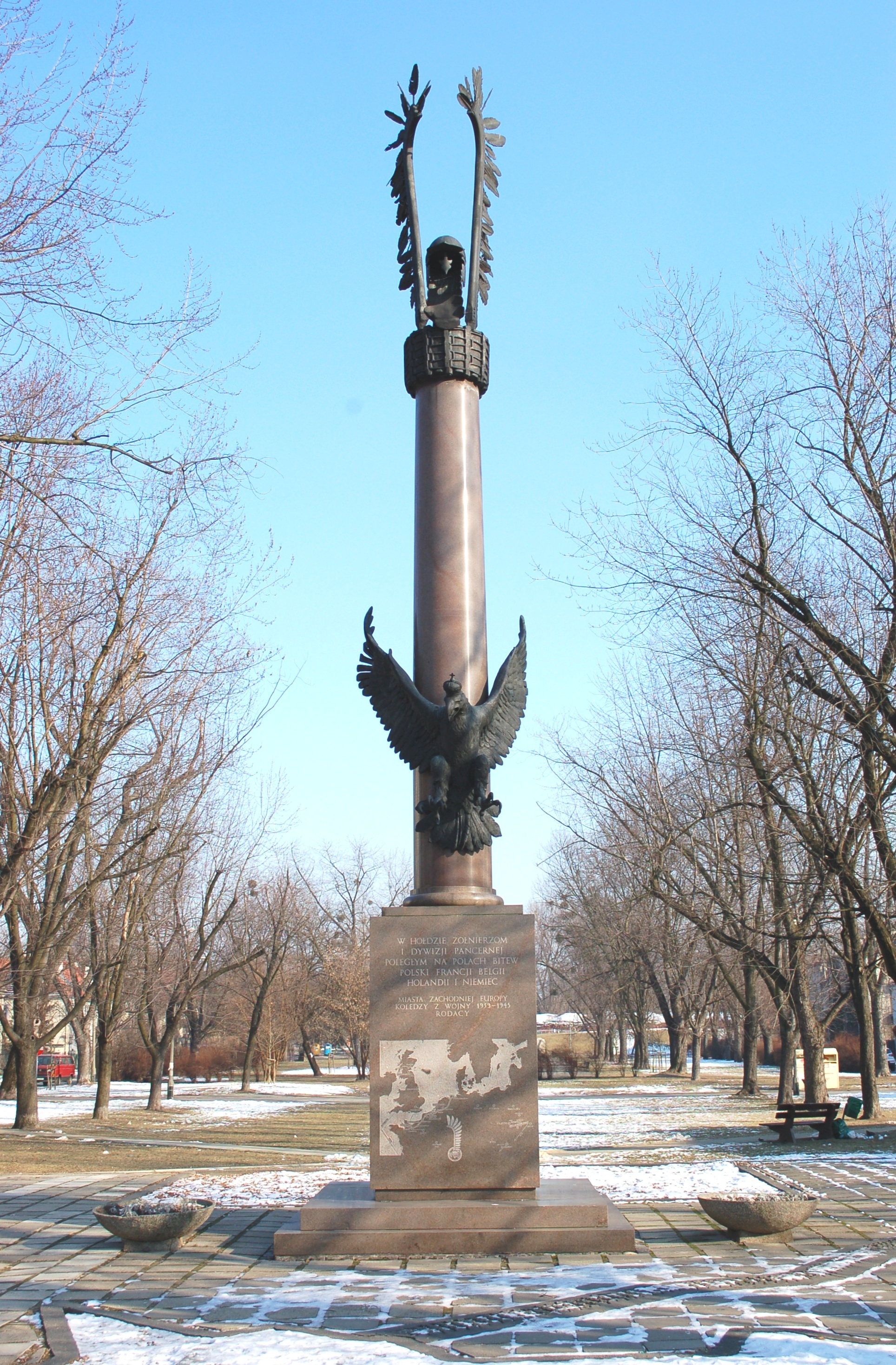
1st Armoured Division Monument

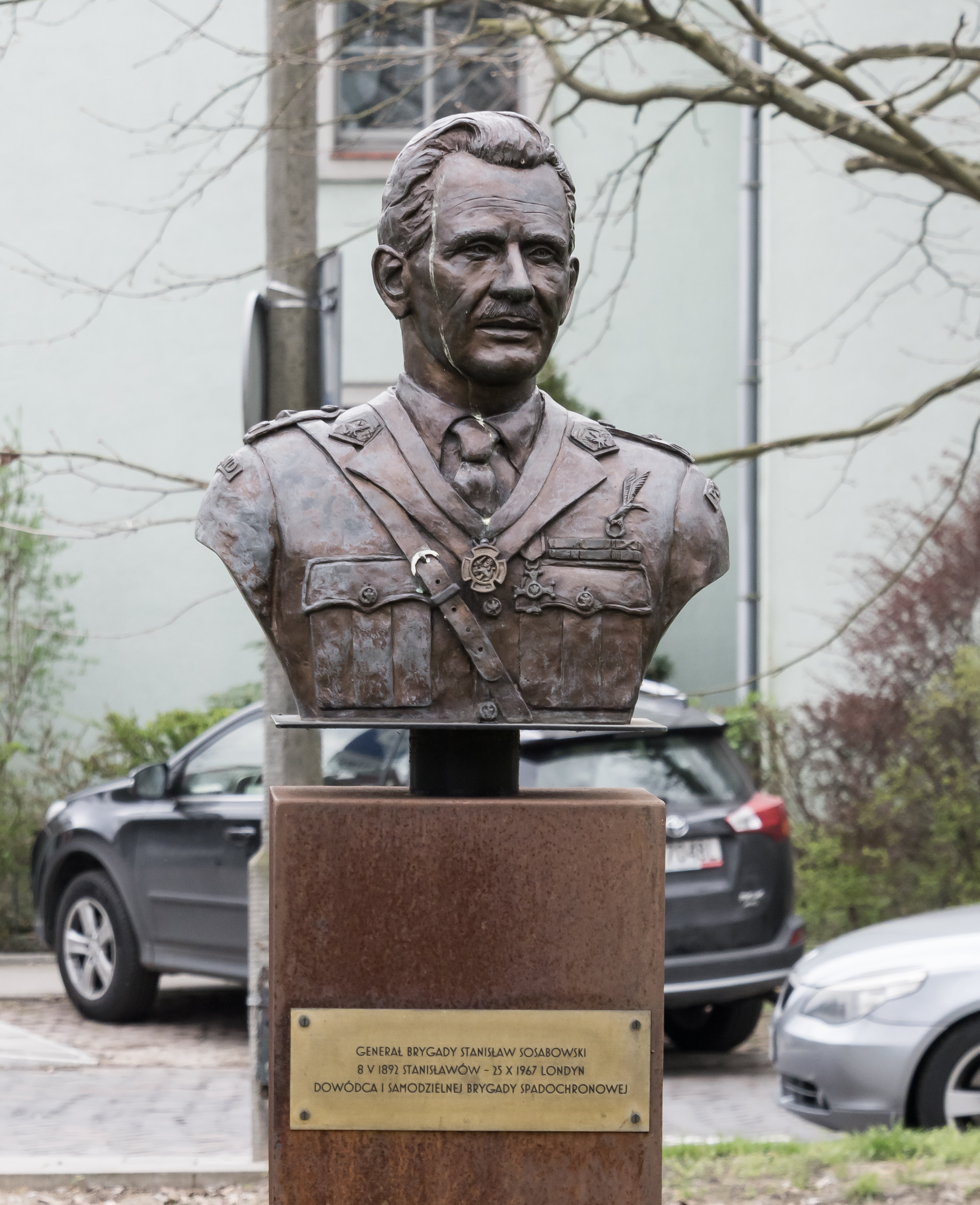
General Stanisław Sosabowski Monument
