= General Stanisław Sosabowski Memorial =

Monument in Warsaw, Poland

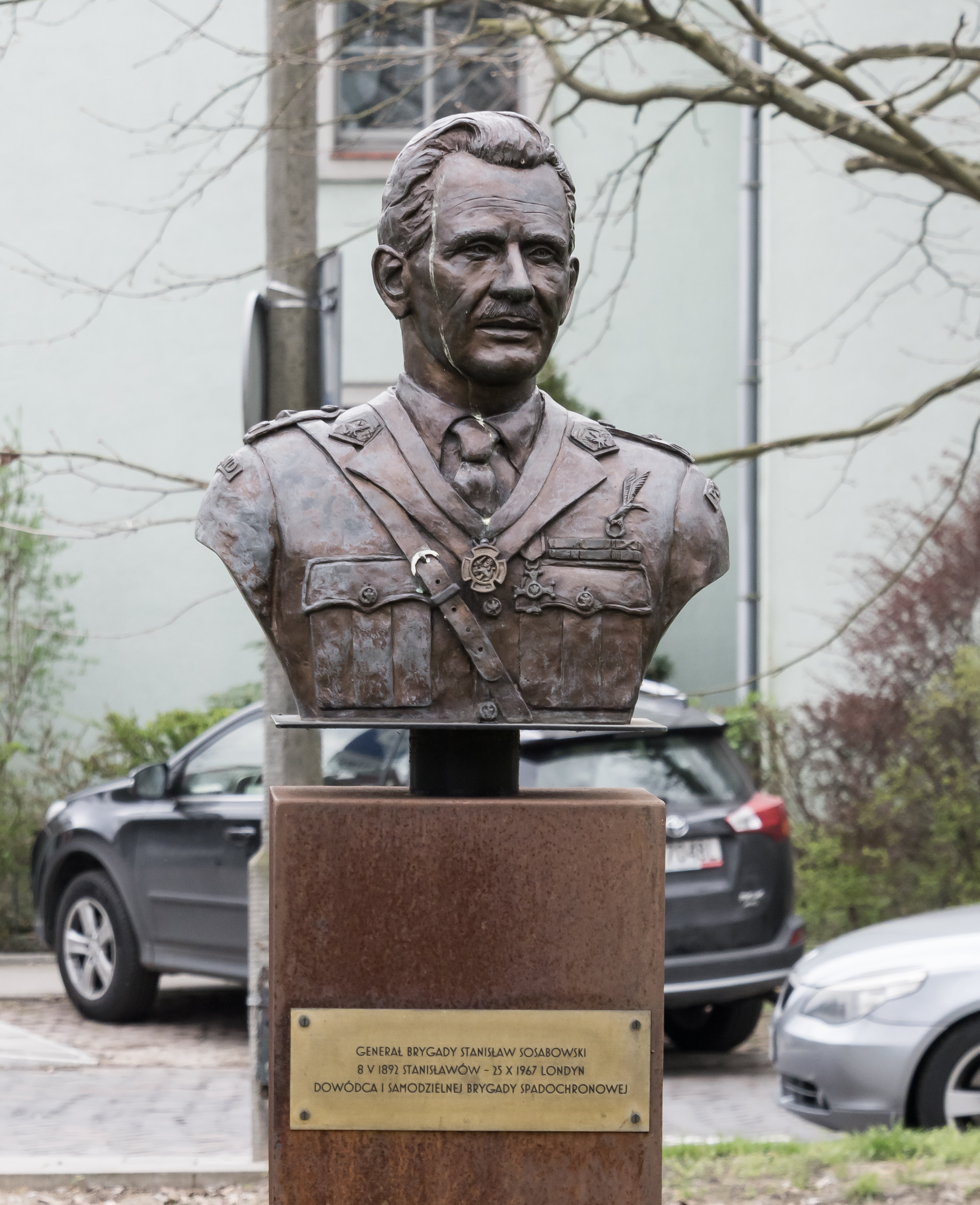
- The monument in 2023.
- Interactive map of General Stanisław Sosabowski Memorial
- Location: Disabled People Square, Warsaw, Poland
- Coordinates: 52°15′50.86″N 20°59′32.77″E
- Designer: Martin Abspoel
- Type: Sculpture
- Opening date: 23 September 2017
- Dedicated to: Stanisław Sosabowski

The General Stanisław Sosabowski Memorial (Note: Polish: Pomnik gen. Stanisława Sosabowskiego) is a monument in Warsaw, Poland, located at the Disabled People Square, near Wojska Polskiego Avenue. It is dedicated to Stanisław Sosabowski, general and leader of the 1st Independent Parachute Brigade of the Polish Armed Forces during the Second World War. The monument was designed by sculptor Martin Abspoel and unveiled on 23 September 2017.

== History ==
The monument dedicated to Stanisław Sosabowski, general and leader of the 1st Independent Parachute Brigade of the Polish Armed Forces during the Second World War, was proposed by the embassy of the Netherlands in Poland and the Driel-Poland Foundation. It was designed by sculptor Martin Abspoel and unveiled on 23 September 2017 in the Disabled People Square in Warsaw, during Paratrooper Day celebrations. The ceremony was attended by Michał Dworczyk, the minister of national defence, and Raphael Varga, the charge d'affaires of the embassy of the Netherlands.

== Characteristics ==
The monument includes a bust of Stanisław Sosabowski in military uniform, placed on a pedestal. On it is placed a plaque with an inscription as transcribed below.

Polish inscription

Generał Brygady Stanisław Sosabowski
8 V 1892 Stanisławów – 25 X 1967 Londyn
Dowódca I Samodzielnej Brygady Spadochronowej

English translation

Brigade General Stanisław Sosabowski
8 May 1892, Stanisławów – 25 October 1967, London
Commander of the 1st Independent Parachute Brigade

== See also ==
- 1st Armoured Division Monument, another World War II memorial monument located nearby
