= Arts and Science Center for Southeast Arkansas =

- Established: 1968
- Location: 701 S. Main Street; Pine Bluff, Arkansas
- Coordinates: 34°13′21″N 92°00′10″W
- Type: Art, science museum
- Website: ww.artssciencecenter.org

The Arts and Science Center for Southeast Arkansas is a 22,000-square-foot (2,000 m^{2}) art and science museum located at 701 Main Street in Pine Bluff, Arkansas. It includes four galleries, a 232-seat theatre, classroom space, administrative offices, vault and adequate preparatory and conservation space for the Center's current programming efforts.

Support for the center is provided in part by the Arkansas Arts Council, an agency of the Department of Arkansas Heritage, and the National Endowment for the Arts.

== History ==
The Arts & Science Center for Southeast Arkansas traces its history to March 4, 1968, when two local community arts groups merged by ordinance of the Pine Bluff City Council and assumed the name of Civic Center Arts Museum. Soon afterward, the center grew to include performing arts, science exhibits, and educational programming, broadening its reach to the ten-county region of Arkansas, Ashley, Bradley, Chicot, Cleveland, Desha, Drew, Grant, Jefferson, and Lincoln counties. After services were expanded to this region, the city council changed the name in May 1969 to Southeast Arkansas Arts & Science Center. In 1971, the center became a commission of the City of Pine Bluff, whereby it operates with a separate decision-making board but works within city government, much like a library. In 1987, the center's name was changed to the Arts & Science Center for Southeast Arkansas.

From 1968 to 1986, the center operated out of the Pine Bluff Civic Center with an art gallery, a science education junior gallery, a permanent collection gallery, a 192-seat theater, and administrative offices. A satellite building—a former fire station—designated for education classes was lent to the center by the city. In 1986, fire heavily damaged the Civic Center facility. Although the theater was eventually restored, the galleries, offices, and collections were moved to a historic home on Martin Street. The old fire station, known as the Little Firehouse Studio, continued as a classroom and student gallery. Due to this geographic separation, the need arose to have a facility that would house all programs under one roof. In anticipation of a building project, the Arts & Science Center for Southeast Arkansas Endowment Fund, Inc., was established in 1986 as a separate 501(c)(3) organization, legally responsible for raising and managing capital and endowment funds.

In 1994, following a successful fundraising campaign, the current facility was built at 701 Main Street in downtown Pine Bluff. The 22,000-square-foot facility was built to AAM accreditation standards. The building includes four galleries, a 232-seat theater, classroom space, administrative offices, a vault, and adequate preparatory and conservation space for the center's programming efforts.

== Activities ==
The center offers several children's science exhibits on a rotating basis. Exhibits have included Illusion Confusion, Good Vibrations, and Grossology. Year-round science classes are also available. The center is a member of a seven-museum consortium in Arkansas, the Arkansas Discovery Network, which is funded by the Donald W. Reynolds Foundation.

Besides exhibiting well-known local, state, regional, national, and international artists, the center offers year-round art classes in sculpture, mixed media, and more. Exhibits have included the work of Frederic Remington and Norman Rockwell, as well as a collection of art and artifacts from western Africa ranging from the fifth century to the late twentieth century. The center, as part of its mission, also regularly exhibits works from artists throughout Arkansas and the Delta region. The center's permanent collection addresses a regional constituency and places emphasis on collecting works by African-American artists, Arkansas artists, and artists living and working in the South.

The center hosts a monthly music series on the first Friday of each month, showcasing the music of Arkansas musicians and featuring the Delta sounds of jazz, blues, soul, rock, and country. The center also hosts community theater productions of both nationally famous works, such as Guys and Dolls and Barefoot in the Park, and plays by Arkansas playwrights. Theater classes and camps for adults and children also are offered.

== Permanent collection ==
The center's permanent collection addresses a regional constituency and places emphasis on collecting works by African-American artists, Arkansas artists, and artists living and working in the Delta region.

=== Paintings ===
The Center's paintings vary in mediums. The styles range from symbolist, to figurative, to narrative, to abstract, to realist. The collection includes several Arkansas artists, including six pieces from Larry D. Alexander’s “Dermott Series”, and the landscapes of Henri Linton. The Center also has the Elsie Mistie Sterling Collection of Botanical Paintings, the largest known collection of botanical watercolor paintings by one artist.

=== Sculptures ===
The Center has an extraordinary collection of Art Deco bronze sculptures, known as the John Stern Collection. There are also several contemporary sculptures by regional artists.

=== Photography ===
The Arts & Science Center for Southeast Arkansas has developed a unique collection of photography, ranging from the documentation of the Mississippi Delta culture to the abstract. The J.C. Covert Collection is historically significant in educating the population about life in the Delta at the turn of the 20th century, focusing on cotton fields and riverboats. The Howard Stern Collection of photographs is more abstract in nature as Stern creates extraordinary views of everyday objects.

=== Drawings and prints ===
The Center has a growing collection of drawings and prints, including seriographs by Jacob Lawrence and Red Grooms, lithographs by Joan Miró and Käthe Kollwitz, and etchings and ink drawings from Benny Andrews.
