= Larry D. Alexander =

American artist and author

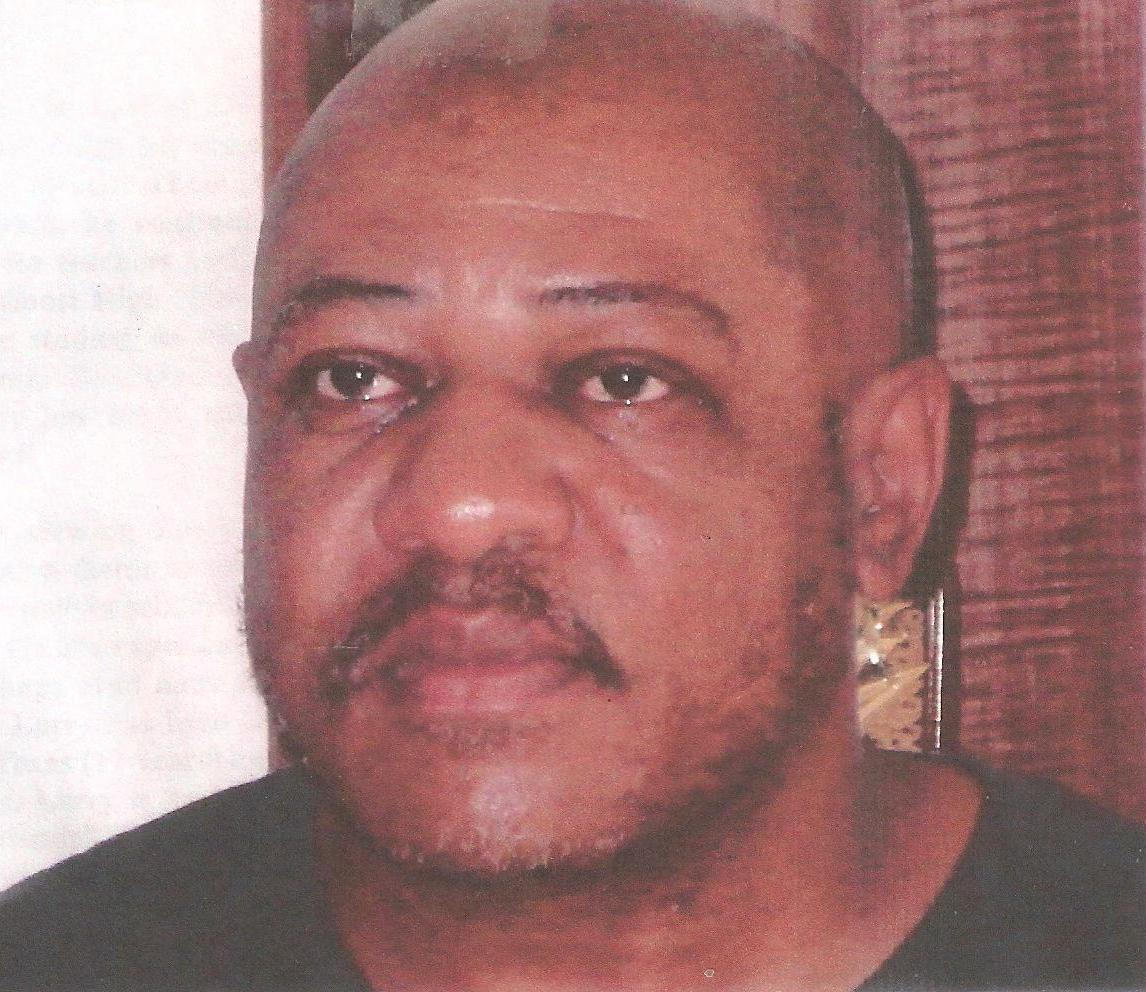
- Born: Larry Dell Alexander; May 30, 1953 (age 73); Dermott, Arkansas, U.S.
- Education: Self-taught
- Known for: Visual artist, author, catechism, evangelist
- Notable work: Clinton Family Portrait
- Movement: Realism

Larry Dell Alexander (born May 30, 1953) is an American artist, Christian author and Catechist from Dermott, Arkansas, in Chicot County. Alexander is best known for his creations of elaborate colorful, and black & white "pen and ink" drawings in his "crosshatching", or "hatching" technique, and his acrylic paintings. His works not only depict the African-American experience but also the experiences of people throughout American history itself. He also received notoriety and a personal presidential thanks for his personal rendition of a "Clinton Family Portrait" oil painting which he gave to U.S. President Bill Clinton in 1995. It is now a part of the collection at the Clinton Presidential Library in Little Rock, Arkansas. He is also known for the Arkansas Schools Tours that he did between 1996 and 2006. He has written several bible commentary books on the Christian Bible and in recent years he is better known for his writings and teachings on Christianity

== Early life and career ==
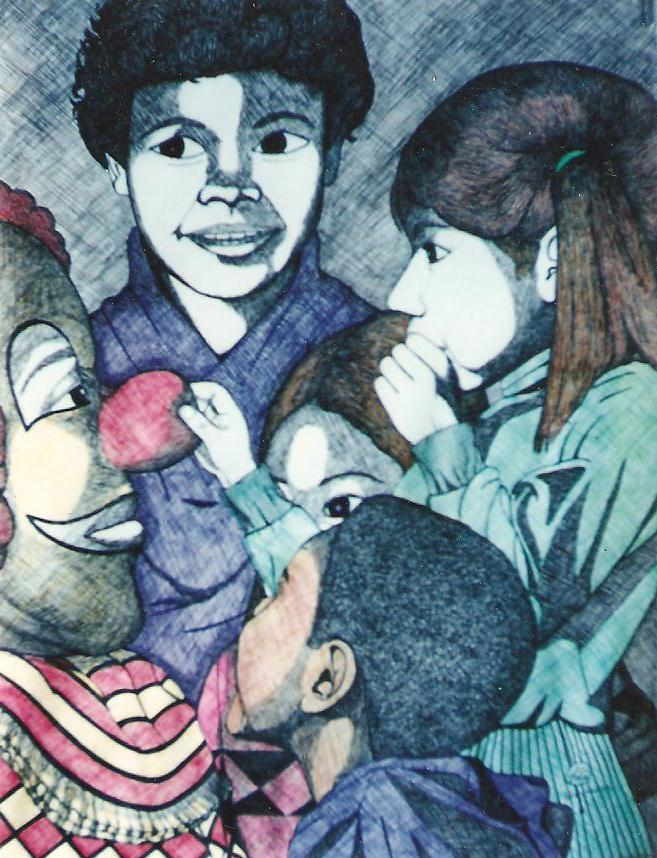
"Send in the Clown", a "Pen & Ink" "Crosshatching drawing" by Alexander

Born in the small rural town of Dermott, Arkansas, to Robert and Janie Alexander, Larry is the fourth of ten children and the second of the union of his parents. His father was a truck driver, and his mother was a beautician. Alexander began drawing at about the age of four. He never received any formal art training during any level of his schooling while growing up, as none was available in his small rural hometown. After graduating from Dermott High School in May 1971, Alexander moved to Pine Bluff, Arkansas, where he studied Architectural Residential Design at Pines Vocational Technical School, now Southeast Arkansas College. In later years he also attended Richland College in Dallas, Texas, where he studied AutoCAD.

Today, six pieces of his work from his popular "Dermott Series", a series of paintings he painted about his childhood home of Dermott, are now a part of the permanent collection at the Arts and Science Center for Southeast Arkansas in Pine Bluff, Arkansas. Alexander's work is mostly influenced by his experiences in life, such as growing up in the rural south during the 1950s and 1960s, as well as his life in Detroit, Michigan, during the 1970s and 1980s.

Alexander moved to Detroit, Michigan, after two years of school in Pine Bluff to seek employment in his chosen field. However, he was unsuccessful in the short run, and instead, he ended up finding work in a Chrysler auto assembly plant and became fascinated with the inner workings of cars. This led him to become a certified mechanic, a craft he worked at for the next seventeen years. He ultimately met and married his wife, Patricia while living in Detroit, and they moved their family to Irving, Texas, where he opened his own auto repair shop and operated it until 1991.

Encouraged by Patricia, he began using his art talent for the first time in fifteen years. His career as a professional artist can be traced back to this point as he developed his "pen and ink" style that he calls "crosshatching", and used it to create several lines of greeting cards under his, now defunct, "Alexander Greeting Cards Company" name. He coined the phrase "The Expressions Line" for his first line of greeting cards in 1991, but did not trademark the name. As a result, Hallmark Cards now has used the name on a line of their cards since 1997. His line should not be confused or associated with their product line. Between 1991 and 1994 he created over 80 pieces of "pen and ink" fine art, including "Renetta", "Girlfriends", "Cowboy Fiddler", "Young Kennedys", and "Roundup". He also used many of his drawings on his "Fine-arTshirt" T-shirt line of the mid-nineties.

Alexander is also a "realist painter" who works in a variety of other mediums including oils, acrylics, and watercolors. He is a self-taught artist who chooses mostly to do exhibits in venues that provide mainstream exposure to a large variety of people such as festivals, schools, malls, libraries, banks, art institutions, and even U.S. Post Office branches on occasion.

=== The Dermott Series ===
In early 1996 Alexander finished and released his popular "Dermott Series", a 20-piece collection of oil and acrylic paintings that offered a nostalgic look back at his childhood of growing up in rural southeast Arkansas. The paintings feature images of people, buildings, and sites of Dermott, Arkansas, such as a cotton gin, his childhood house, where he went to school, and other images. Alexander said at the time that, "I did the Dermott Series for many personal reasons, and I'm overwhelmed by the response this collection is creating here in Texas". The series includes "Birthplace", "Where I grew up", "Picking Cotton", "Cotton Gin", "Hot Grits", "In the kitchen with mama", and the old Chicot County High School, among others.

=== The Detroit Series ===
In 1999 Alexander unveiled his "Detroit Series", a series of oil and acrylic paintings of various sites in Detroit, Michigan, at the American Black Artist Institute on West Grand Boulevard in Detroit. The nine-piece series includes paintings on Belle Isle Park, the Detroit skyline, the Detroit River, Hitsville USA (the original home for Motown Records), Greektown Historic District, the old Tiger Stadium (Detroit), the old J.L. Hudson building, former mayor Coleman A. Young, and many more.

=== The Delta Series ===
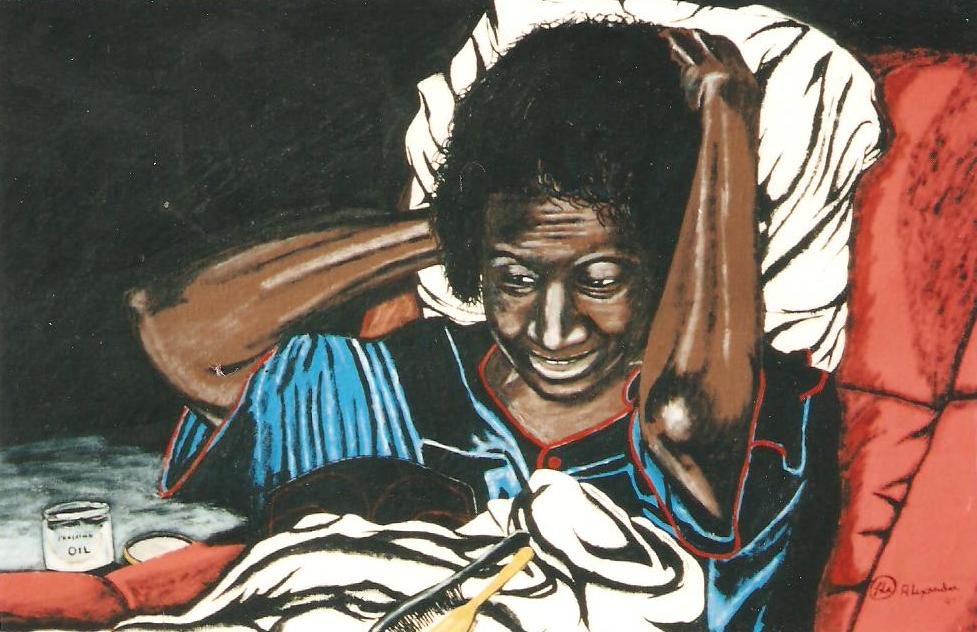
"Aunt Eira Mae", from "the Delta Series" an Acrylic painting by Larry D. Alexander – The African American Museum (Dallas, Texas) - 2004

In May 1998 Alexander unveiled his "Delta Series, which was painted entirely with acrylics, during "the Arkansas Schools Tours". The tour was expanded that year to include stops in Greenville, Mississippi, and Memphis, Tennessee. This series included paintings of the Mississippi Alluvial Plain region from Monroe, Louisiana, to Memphis. It includes a painting of Graceland, Elvis Presley's former home, the landmark Greenville Courthouse in Greenville, a perspective of Beale Street in Memphis, and his classic rendition of a "Cotton Farm", among other subjects. Another piece from the Delta Series, "Aunt Eira Mae", was donated to the permanent collection of the African American Museum (Dallas, Texas), in 2004.

=== The Series of P.A.T.R.I.C.E ===
Alexander has also donated work to art departments of schools and colleges. In October 1996 at halftime at the inaugural football game, billed as the "Mobil Gridiron Classic", at Texas Stadium in Irving, Texas, Alexander presented a piece from one of his series, "The series of P.A.T.R.I.C.E", to the president, and the chancellor, of the participating colleges, respectively, Texas Southern University and the University of Arkansas at Pine Bluff.

=== The Sixties Series ===
Alexander's most popular Pen and Ink art series, "The Sixties Series" has been exhibited in schools, libraries, and art institutions in several places since it was completed in 1993. It consists of elaborate drawings of well known figures and events of the 1960s, such as the civil rights Selma to Montgomery marches of 1965, and portraits of Martin Luther King Jr., Lyndon Johnson, Malcolm X, Medgar Evers, and Rosa Parks. This series also covers the Vietnam War.

The theme pieces in the collection are a piece called "Composite Sixties", and one called "Composite Protests", which make up a composite of people, places and events that were prominent in the 1960s. For example, they show images of John F. Kennedy, Lyndon Johnson, and Richard M. Nixon, the United States presidents who served during the sixties, also J. Edgar Hoover, Jackie Kennedy, Ted Kennedy, Robert F. Kennedy, an image of U.S. astronauts landing on the Moon in 1969, and many of the American protests that took place during this turbulent decade, to name a few.

== African-American history book ==
In 2001, Alexander finished his first book called African-American History at a Glance, which also included several pen and ink drawings of African-Americans who have contributed substantially to the American success story. "There is a lack of input regarding African-Americans in the American history curriculum of schools all over America" Mr. Alexander says. "There are a lot of schools that offer it as a choice to students, but I think it should be a part of regular American history".

Alexander's book was used to help create a supplemental text, that was later put together by the Irving Independent School District to help improve the American history curriculum in the high schools of Irving, Texas, in 2002. His book deliberately ignores the contributions of African-Americans in the areas of sports and entertainment, as he feels they are already too well known and over-emphasized in society. Alexander says in his book that, "By no means is this an attempt to downplay the prowess of these particular individuals, or to discourage other individuals who aspire to excel in those areas. This publication is intent on bringing to the forefront, some of the African-American contributions that have historically been largely ignored".

== The Arkansas School Tours ==
Alexander and his cousin Lawrence "Larry" Crockett, both natives of Dermott, Arkansas, put together the first "Arkansas schools tour" in 1996, and in May of that year, visited ten schools in seven cities in four days. Crockett and his son, B.J., both traveled with Alexander on the initial tour, while they were on a one-week break from the tour of the Rodgers and Hammerstein Broadway musical Carousel, which B.J. had a role in at the time. After the first year however, the tour was continued on by Alexander alone through 2007. Alexander says he wanted to give back to his home state of Arkansas and be a blessing to the children who live there, and, because of the success of the first tour in 1996, Alexander decided to continue doing it once annually for the next ten years. Its major objective was to instill hope and encouragement in the children of Arkansas, and to aid them in making good choices during the developing stages of life. These annual visits to high schools, middle schools, and elementary schools, were also conducted to instruct and encourage children in pursuing their goals and careers in the visual arts, as well as other areas, and to stay away from illegal drugs. It was during the second tour in 1997 that Alexander incorporated his anti-drug slogan "Eradicate Drug Use Common Among Teens Everywhere" (EDUCATE). Alexander usually ended his tour with a two-day art exhibit and print signing at the Dermott, Arkansas Crawfish Festival.

== Religion ==
It seems as if God has placed a hunger and thirst inside of each of us, innately from birth, and the only way to satisfy that hunger or thirst is by seeking and ultimately finding Him. It is for the purpose of God that man was ever created in the first place. And just as no man has ever created anything that weren't for his own purpose or benefit, so it is with God. Man was created to serve God. And until we can grasp and understand that, we'll just continue to meander around, looking for physical answers, to problems, that have always been, spiritual

— Larry D. Alexander

Alexander is a devout Christian who teaches Sunday school and has also served as a Church deacon. He has taught Sunday school for several years and he also teaches through his books, online "Weekly Sunday School Lesson" commentaries, which are based on the international Sunday school lesson system, his online Book by Book Bible Study, and, his national e-mail system. He also has created a large body of artwork in Christian and biblical themes over the years, such as his paintings, "The Twenty-third Psalm Series", which are a visual depiction of the verses of Psalm 23 in the Holy Bible, "Memories of St. Paul", which is a depiction of his childhood church in Dermott, Arkansas, "Bible Stories", "The Fall of Man", a depiction of Adam and Eve after being evicted from the Garden of Eden, "Sunday Sermon", and many others.

== Personal life ==
Alexander lives in Texas with his wife Patricia. They have four children.

== Books ==
- Home and Church Bible study commentaries from Paul's letter to the Romans - ISBN 978-1-105-66048-1
- Home and Church Bible study commentaries from the books of Galatians, Ephesians, & Philippians - ISBN 978-0-578-15400-8
- Home and Church Bible Study Commentaries from the Book of Ezekiel - ISBN 978-1-329-94443-5
- Home and Church Bible Study Commentaries from the Book of Acts - ISBN 978-1-365-01313-3
- Sunday school lessons from the Book of the Acts of the Apostles - ISBN 978-1-4116-9831-4
- Sunday school lessons from the Gospel according to John Mark - ISBN 978-0-615-13552-6
- Sunday school lessons from the Apostle Paul's letter to the Romans - ISBN 978-0-615-15342-1
- Home Bible study commentaries from The Gospel of John - ISBN 978-0-615-20347-8
- Home and Church Bible study commentaries from The Book of Hebrews - ISBN 978-0-578-03453-9
- Home and Church Bible Study Commentaries from the Apostle Paul's First and Second Letters to the Corinthians - ISBN 978-0-359-17694-6
- Home and Church Bible Study Commentaries from the Book of Genesis - ISBN 978-0-359-36349-0

== Gallery ==
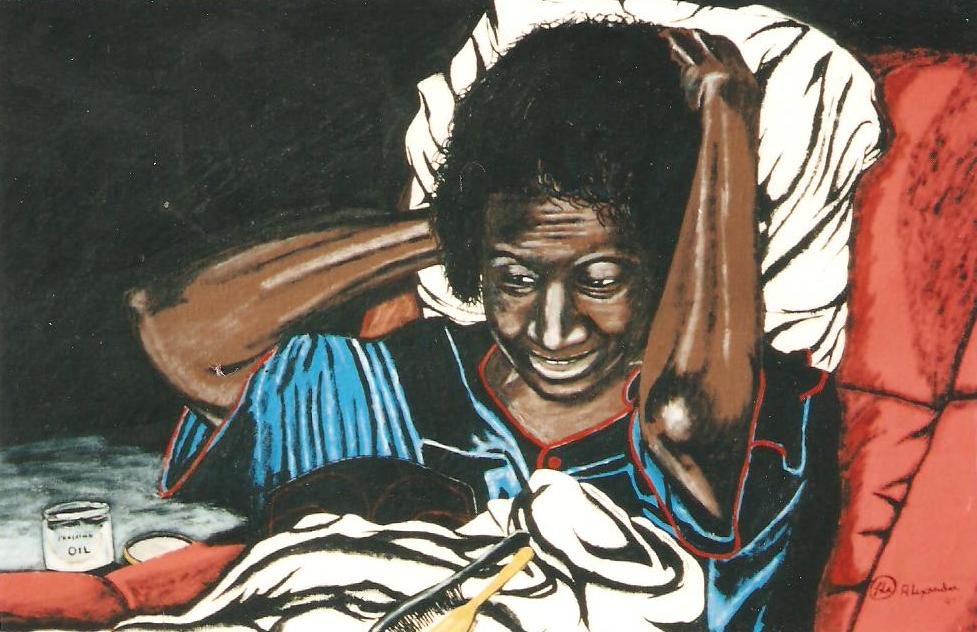
Aunt Ira Mae

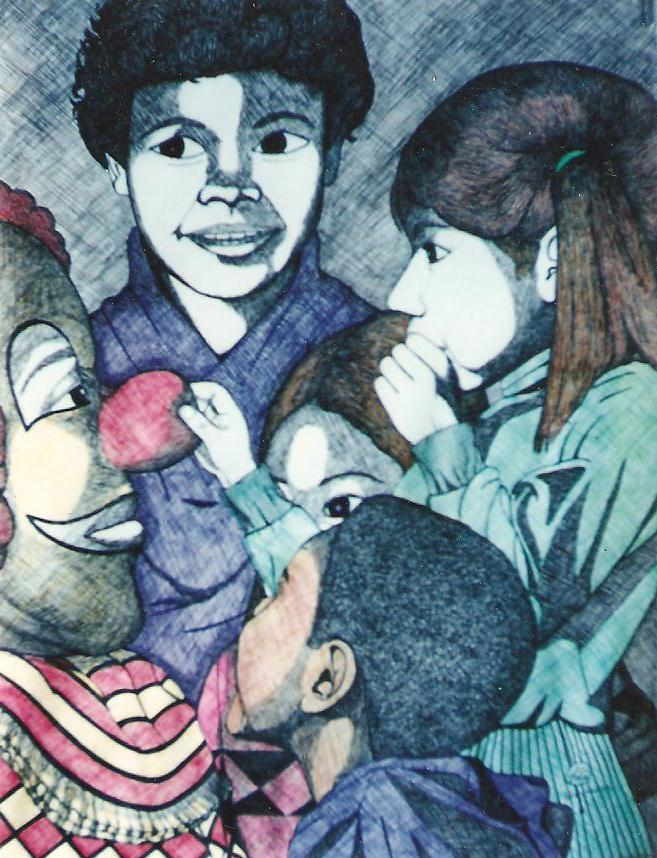
Send in the Clown

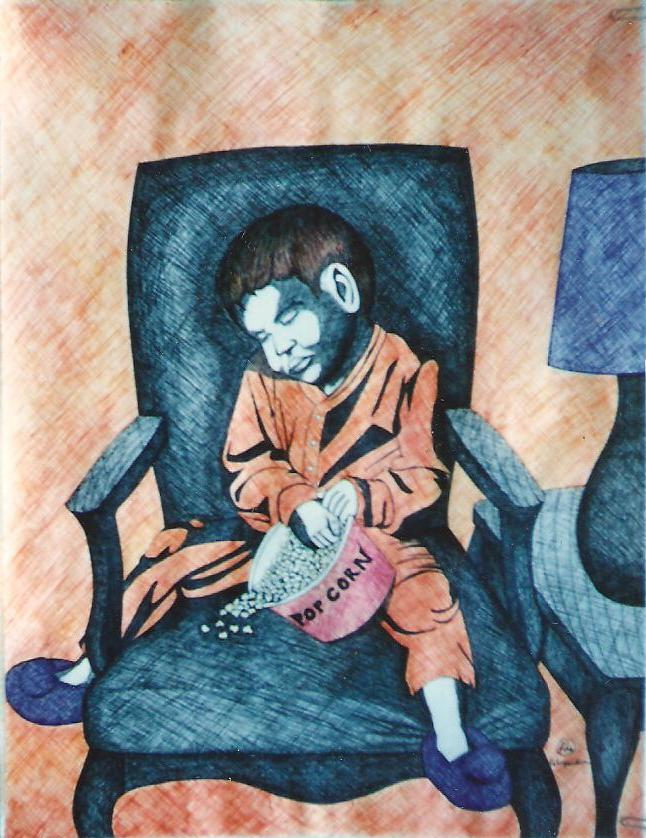
Sleepy Head

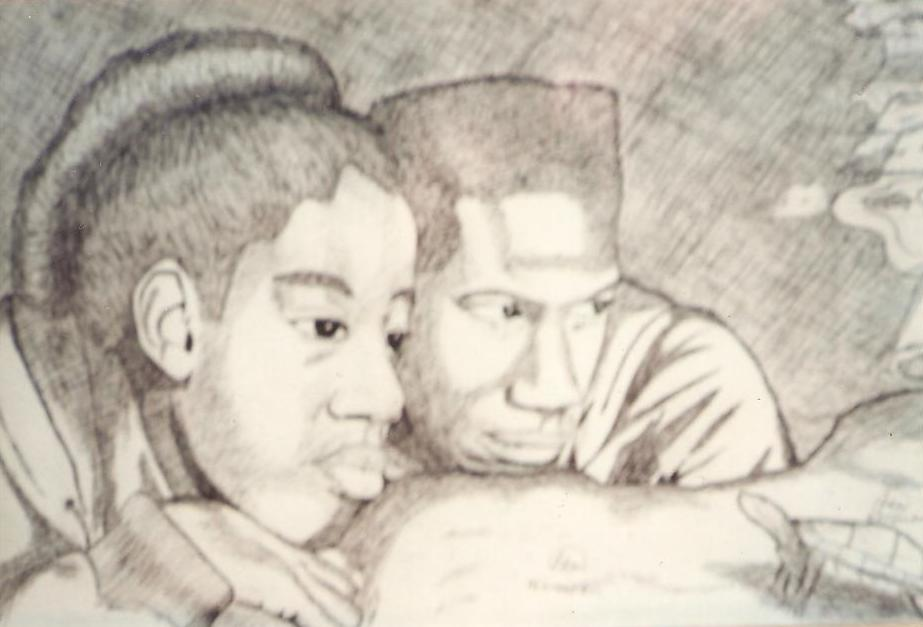
Down by the Sea

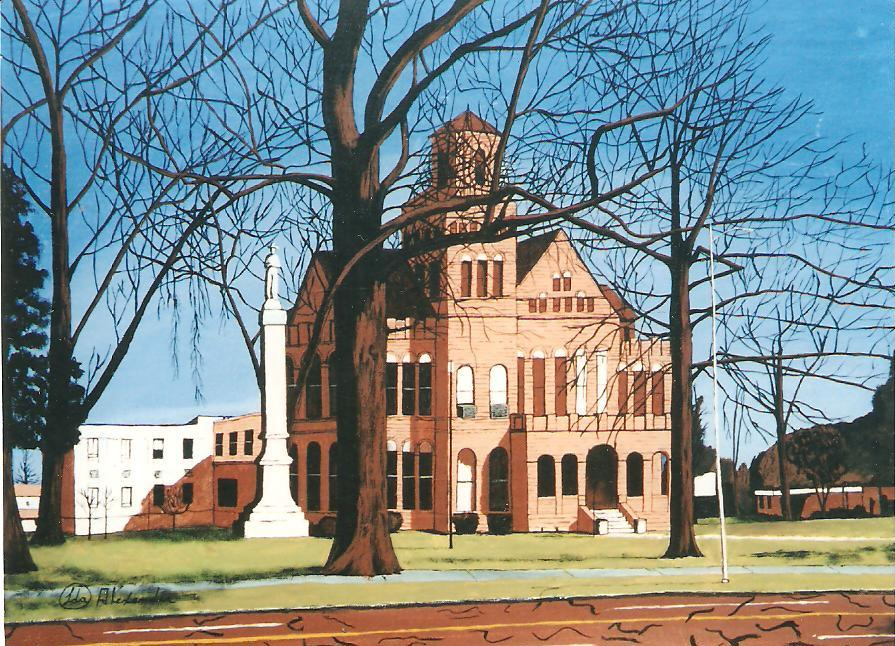
Greenville Courthouse

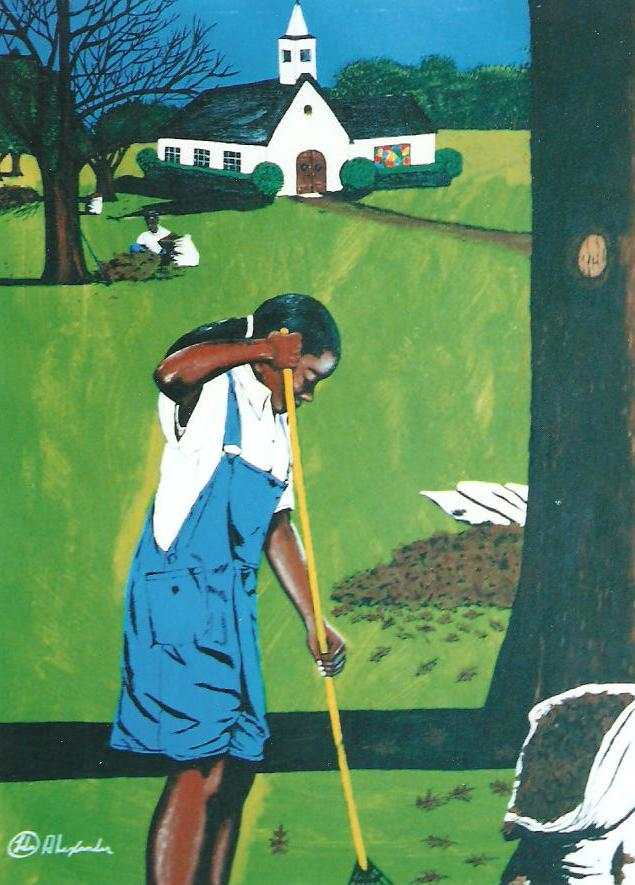
Helping Out

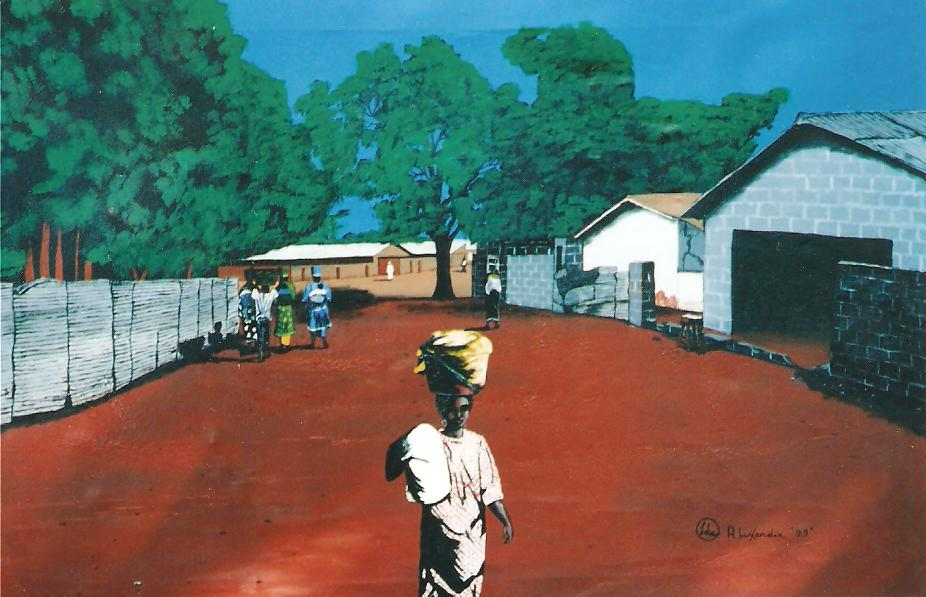
African Mothers

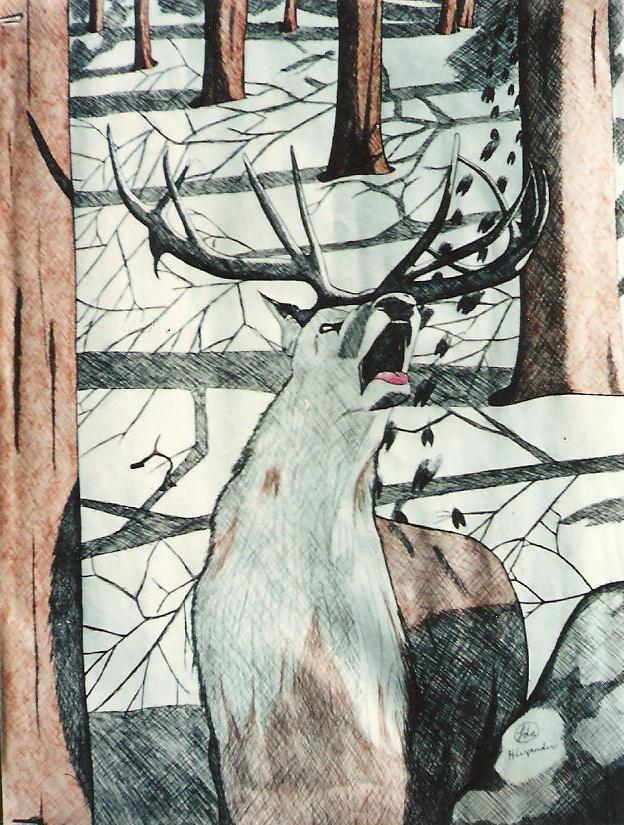
Moose Call

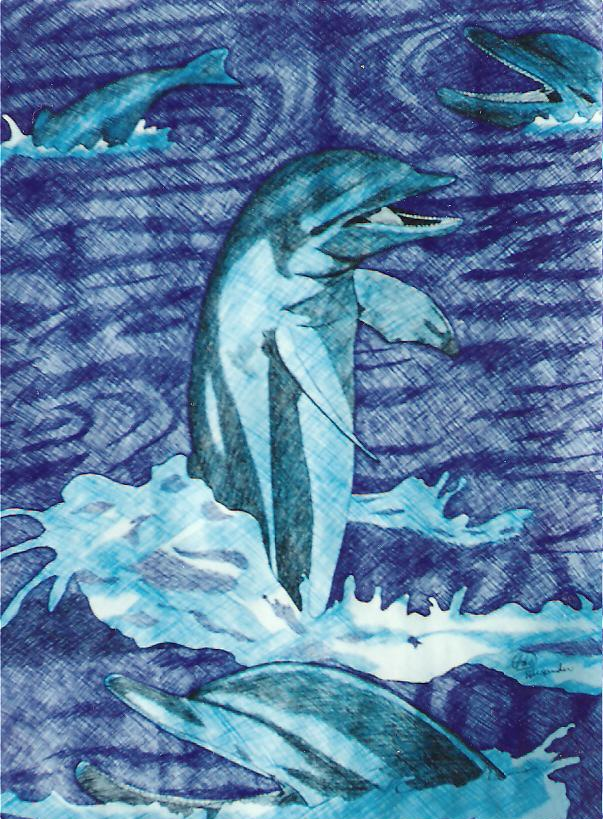
Princess of the Blue

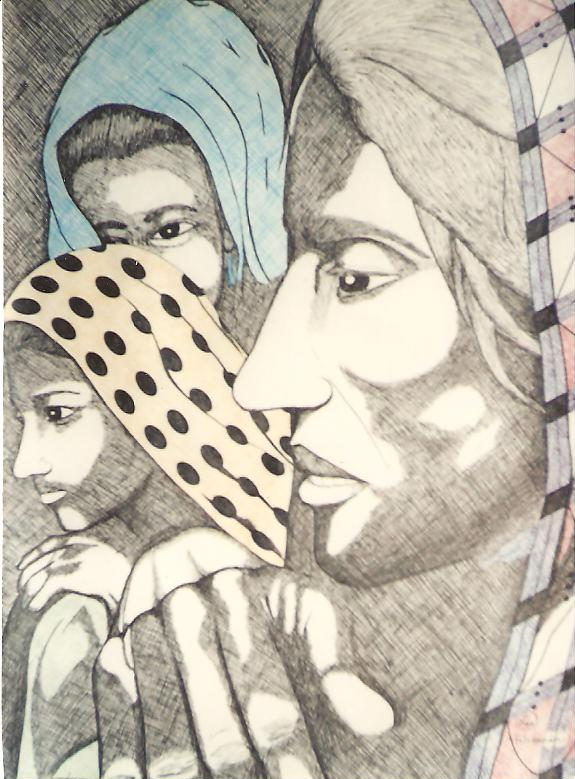
Daughter's Loyalty

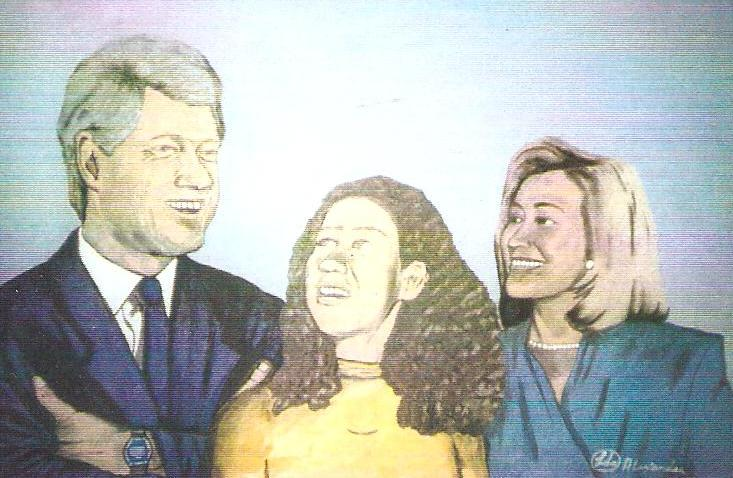
Clinton Family Portrait
