= Clinton Family Portrait =

1995 painting by Larry D. Alexander

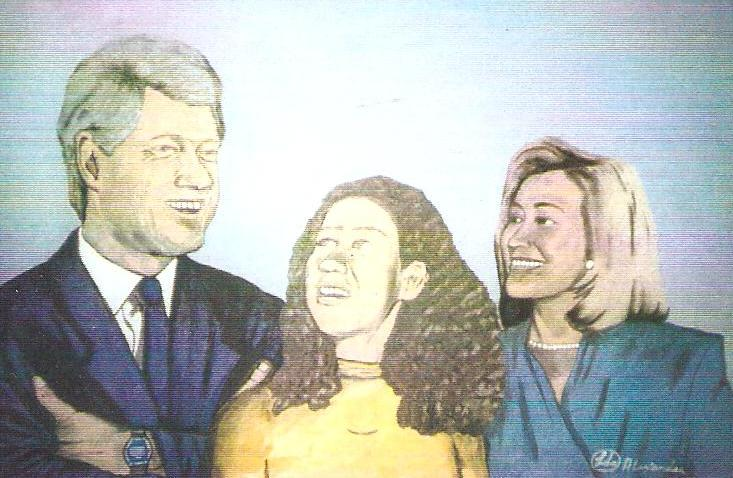
Clinton Family Portrait, an oil painting by Larry D. Alexander

Clinton Family Portrait is a 1995 oil painting on canvas by American artist Larry D. Alexander from Dermott, Arkansas, United States. It was created in 1995 and given as a gift to then U.S. President Bill Clinton who is also a native of Arkansas. It is a unique painting in that Alexander has done very few known oil paintings. Most of his paintings are done in acrylics, and there are a few done in watercolors. This portrait is a unique blend of cartoon likeness and realism. It is now a part of the permanent collection at the Clinton Presidential Library in Little Rock, Arkansas.

== Source of inspiration ==
In an early 1996 interview with a Dallas Morning News Irving, Texas reporter, Alexander explains his inspiration:

I was with a group of kids and we said that if there was ever a president from Arkansas, we'd do a portrait of him. It was just a joke at the time, and years later, I had forgotten about it. But one day, when Clinton was doing well in the presidential race and it looked like he was going to win, the memory just popped back in my mind. It was eerie, but inspirations are like that.

== Description ==
The Clinton Family Portrait's dimensions are 24 inches long by 36 inches wide and is painted with oil paints on canvas. The oil colors used are flesh, blue, yellow, and brown tones, as well as grays. It was created in Irving, Texas in early 1995 and was shipped to the White House in March or April of that same year. Lori Abrams, who was a spokeswoman in the White House correspondence department at that time, told the Fort Worth Star-Telegram newspaper that, "We can't say exactly where it is, but its where they want it".
