= Ilan Averbuch =

Israeli-born New York sculptor

- Averbuch in 2010
- Born: 26 December 1953 (age 72); Israel
- Education: Wimbledon School of Art (1977–1978); School of Visual Arts (BFA, 1981); Hunter College (MFA, 1985)
- Known for: Large-scale public sculpture and installations
- Awards: Rhodes Family Award, School of Visual Arts (1982); DAAD Award, Berlin (1985–1986); Mid-Atlantic Art Award (1991); Pollock-Krasner Foundation grant (2001); Americans for the Arts Public Art Network Year in Review (2005, 2012)
- Website: ilanaverbuch.com

Ilan Averbuch (Hebrew: אילן אברבוך; born 1953, Israel) is a sculptor living and working in Long Island City, New York. Averbuch creates large-scale monumental artworks and installations for gallery and museum exhibitions in addition to outdoor public spaces.

== Biography ==
Ilan Averbuch was born in Israel in 1953. From 1976 to 1977, Averbuch traveled to Central and South American, living between the Cordilleras and the Amazon region, a formative trip that solidified his intention to become an artist. He moved to London in 1977 to attend the Wimbledon School of Art. In 1979, Averbuch moved to New York City to attend the School of Visual Arts to complete his B.F.A. He continued his art education at Hunter College in New York and received his M.F.A. in 1985.

Averbuch traveled back to Israel in the mid 1980s to install his first official public project for the city of Tel Aviv. In 1985, he lived in Berlin on a grant from the German Academic Exchange Service (D.A.A.D). The artist returns to New York and exhibited Songs of Love and Hate at the Socrates Sculpture Park in 1988, an outdoor sculpture park overlooking the East River.

In the 1990s, Averbuch started to more actively participate in public art competitions. In 1995, he traveled to India to work in the foundries of Calcutta, producing several large works in cast iron. Over the course of the next thirty years, the artist continued to travel, exhibit, and produce public art commissions internationally in New York, Germany, France, Switzerland, Canada, and India, among others. Today, he lives and works in Long Island City, New York. He is represented by Nancy Hoffman Gallery in New York City.

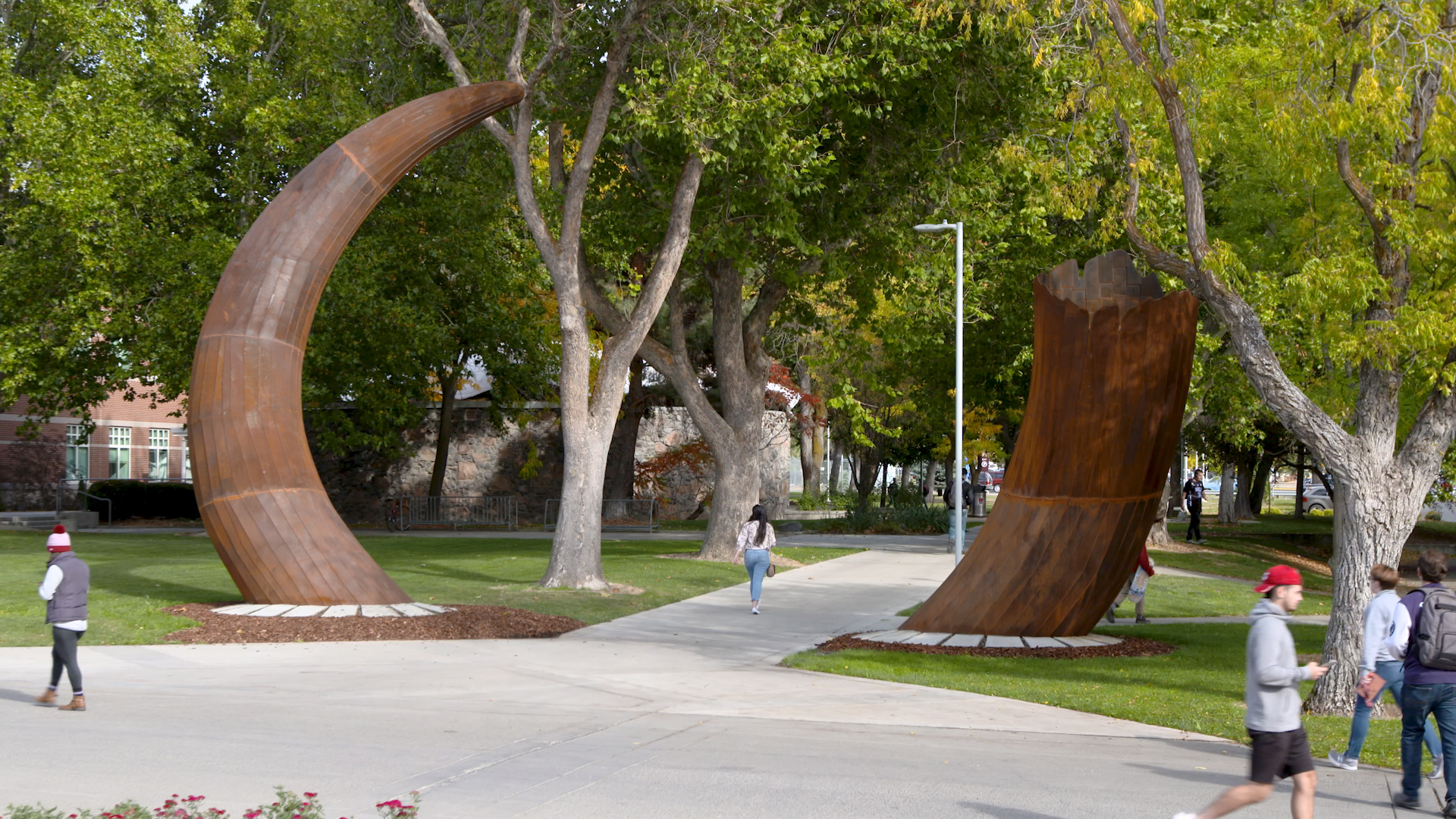
Ilan Averbuch, Mammoth, 2018, Central Washington University, Ellensburg, WA.

== Work ==
Over his forty-year career, Averbuch has become one of the more successful public sculptors of the twenty-first century. His work appears across the globe in India, Israel, Poland, Germany, Switzerland, Canada, and throughout the United States. The monumental works are on an architectural scale and are designed to integrate with the environment.

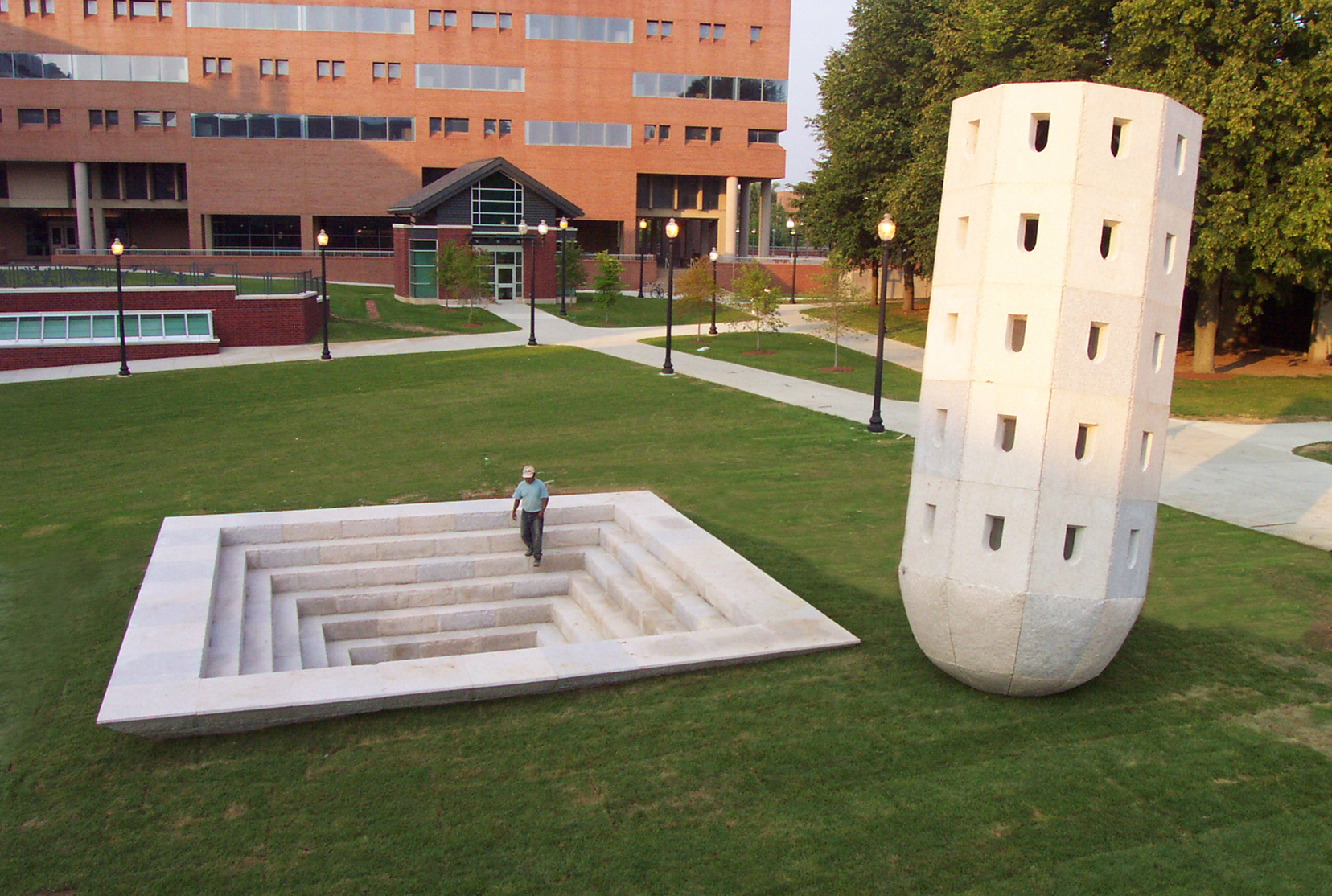
Ilan Averbuch, The Dove Tower and Steps to the Bottom of a Pyramid, 2004, Storrs, CT.

His works are made from materials such as stone, wood, steel, copper, lead, glass and aluminium. He uses stone repurposed from old roads and bridges. The materials exhibit the traces of their previous uses and applications to which the artist adds his own marks. Reoccurring symbols include organic forms and natural elements; figurative forms referencing the human body; man-made objects and architectural forms. The meanings are open to interpretation. Among recurring themes in his work are civilization and its history, growth, transformation, the inevitable passage of time, dreams and memory, the relationship between text and image, and the conflict between our aspirations and our limitations. Averbuch's imagination circles back on itself, recycling imagery and transforming reoccurring symbols, creating endless paths of interpretation. A recent work, Tappan Zee (2020), depicts a row of seven abstract steel figures carrying a stone canoe. The sculpture pays tribute to the indigenous Native American Lenape tribe and their history along the Hudson River. Avanim Vetseadim (Steps and Stones) (2008) is located at Gezer Park in Leawood, Kansas. A stone ladder positioned within a pond reaches toward the sky, creating a reflection in the water that stretches downward. The Dove Tower and Steps to the Bottom of a Pyramid (2002) occupies the central lawn at the University of Connecticut. The installation comprises a 21-foot-high upside down tower composed of large flat stones. It stands over an inverted pyramid burrowing 10 feet below ground. The pyramid offers a quiet and contemplative space, while the precariously leaning tower is unsettling. Three works are installed at the Rose Garden Arena in Portland, Oregon. In The Little Prince (1995), a giant fallen copper crown depicts the ruin of an ancient majesty. Another work, Terra Incognita (1995), creates an enormous gateway made of wood and massive blocks of stone.

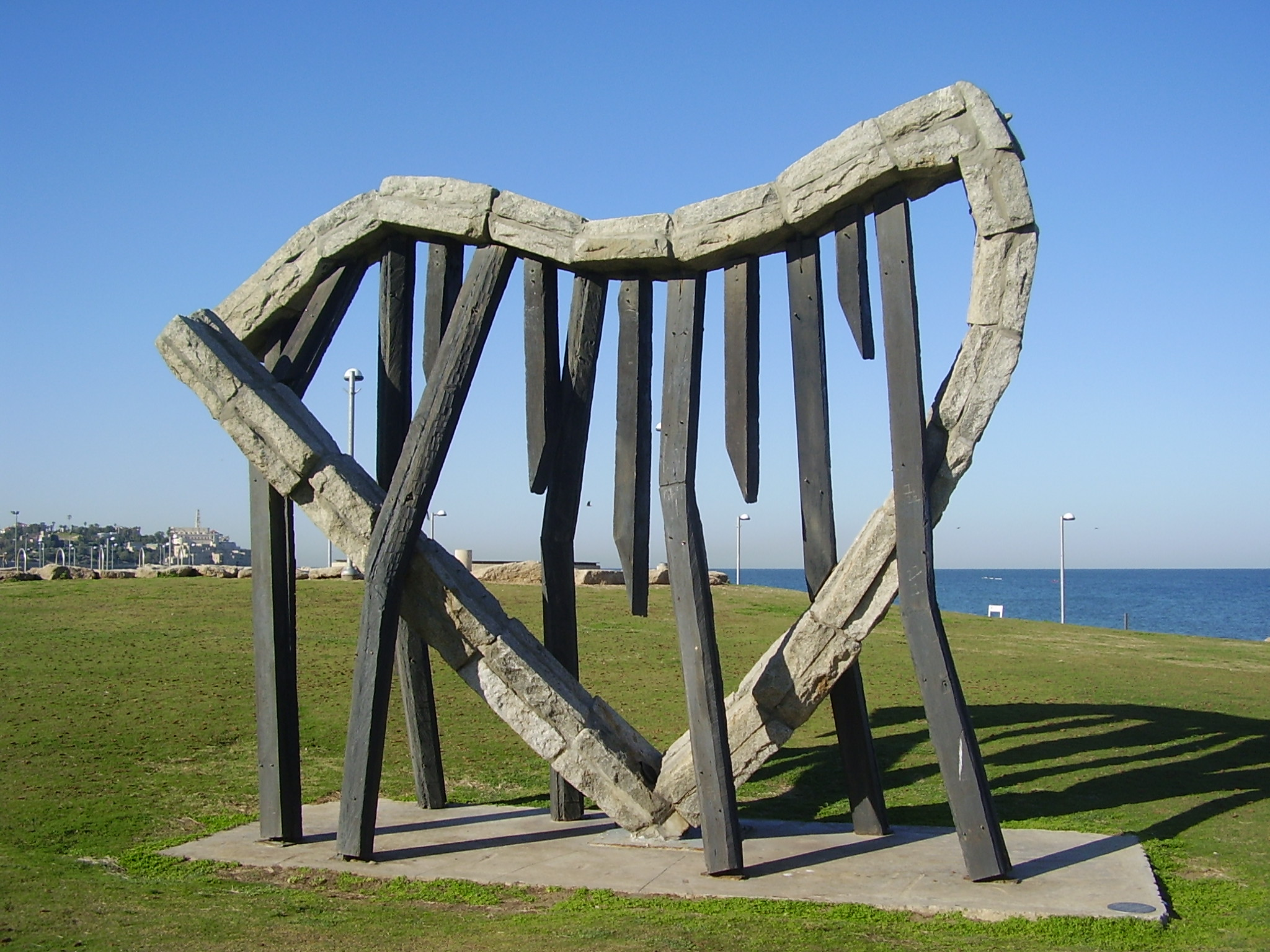
Ilan Averbuch, Harp, Sea, and the Quiet Wind, 1989, Tel Aviv, Israel.

Averbuch's international public installations began in the mid-1980s with a commission for the City of Tel Aviv, Israel. Harp, the Sea, and the Quiet Wind (1989) portrays a stone, wood, and steel harp installed on the border between Jaffa and Tel Aviv at the Sir Charles Clore Park. In 1986, the artist was invited to Berlin to build a sculpture commemorating the city's 750th anniversary. Wheat in Berlin evokes the silhouettes of figures marching down the railroad tracks and is made of recycled railroad tracks and discarded stones, remnants from the aftermath of the Second World War. In the 1990s, Lutz Teutloff, a German philanthropist and art collector purchased Averbuch's work and donated it to the Brock University in Ontario, Canada. The university currently owns three pieces that are displayed throughout their campus. Averbuch returned to India in 1998 to build Calcutta Ladder, a 28-foot copper ladder installed in the interior atrium of a corporation in Kolkata.

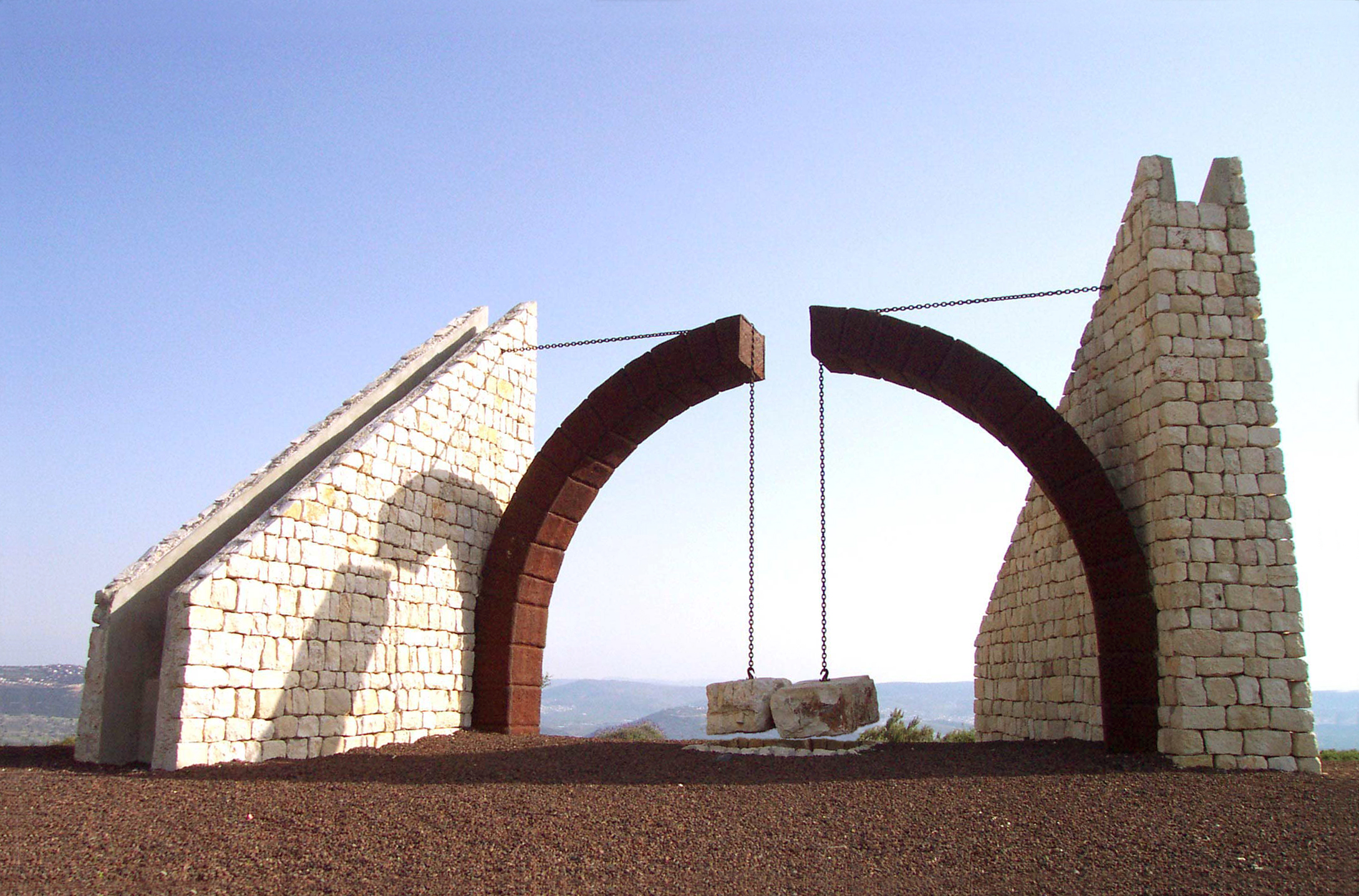
Ilan Averbuch, Divided World, 2000, Lavon, Israel.

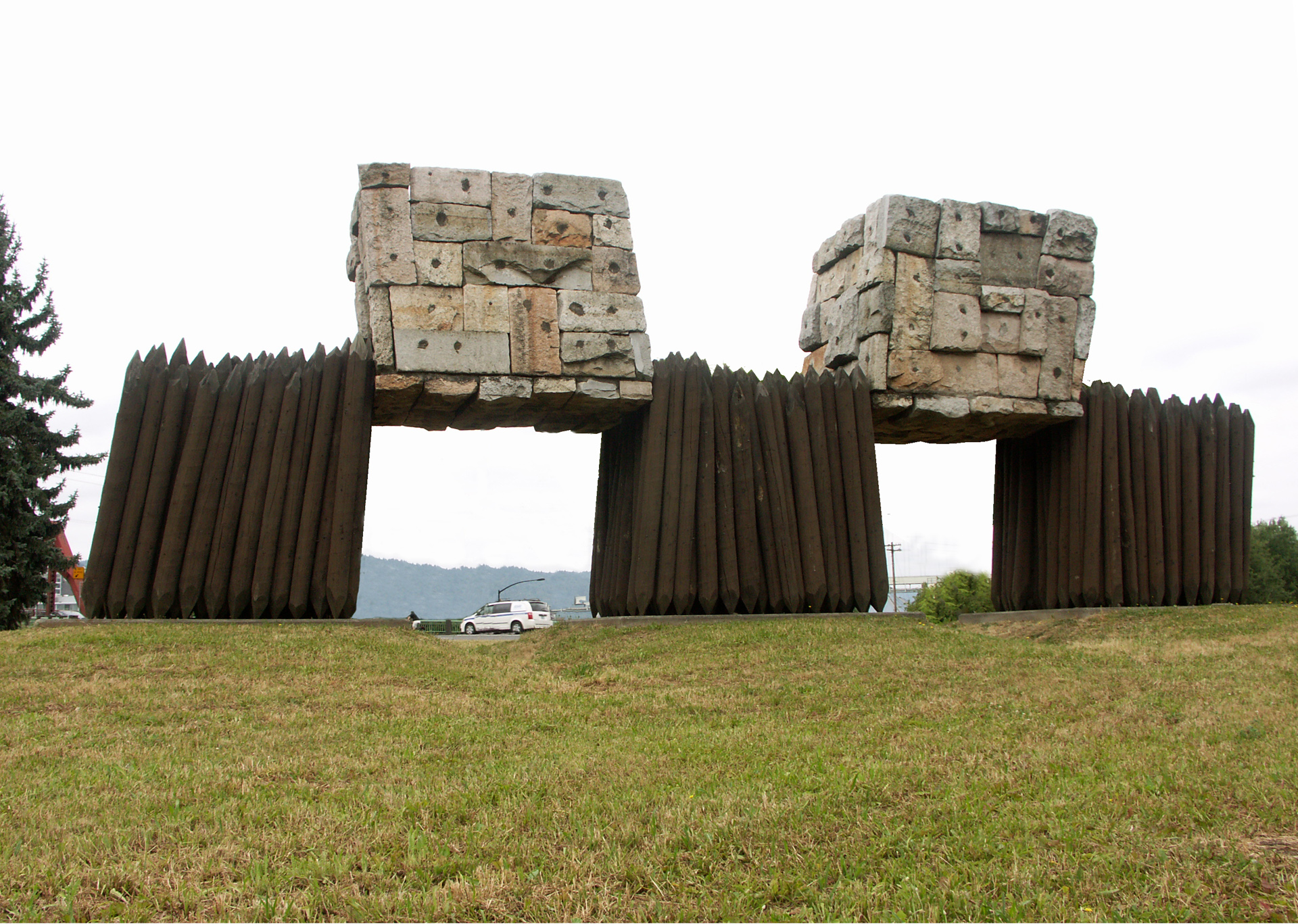
Ilan Averbuch, Terra Incognita, 1995, Portland, Oregon.

The Divided World, 2000, installed in Lavon, Israel overlooks the Beit Hakerem Valley. The work consists of two stone stairways, mirror images of each other but running in opposite directions. Between them extend two half arches, each one rising from a stairway and stretching toward the other. Two boulders hang from chains at the ends of the arches. The overall form of the work was inspired by the observatories at Jantar Mantar in India. The work speaks of broken dreams and continually lost possibilities installed amidst Galilee, Israel in an area of difficult and interminable conflicts.

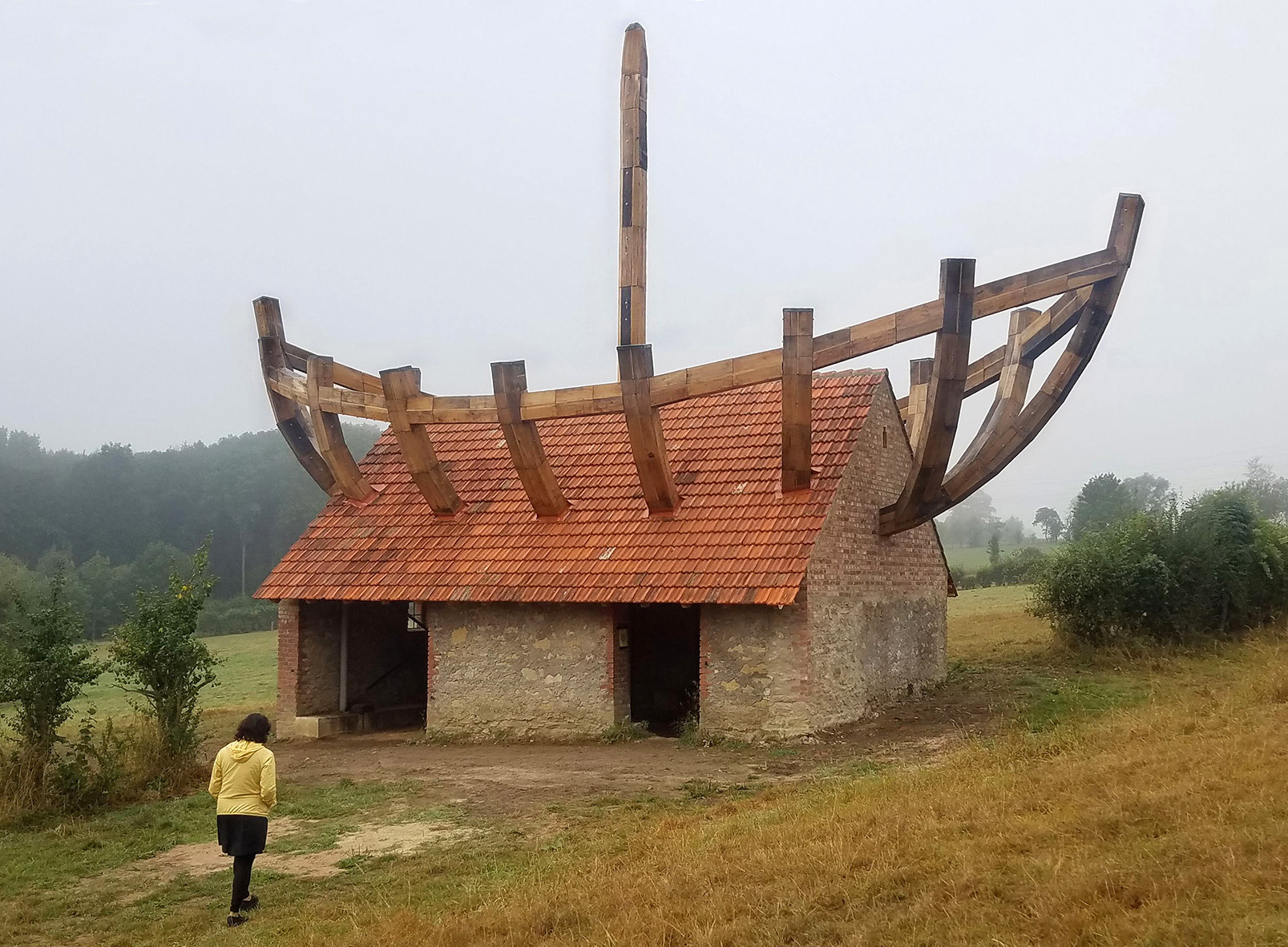
Ilan Averbuch, The House in the Boat The Boat in the House, 2019, Nieheim, Germany.

In 2019, Averbuch created a site-specific sculpture at Gut Holzhausen in Nieheim, Pömbsen, Germany. The work builds upon a preexisting stone house with a red-tiled roof. A wooden structure represents the skeleton of an old boat bursting from the house. The artist created it from wood from the surrounding forest.

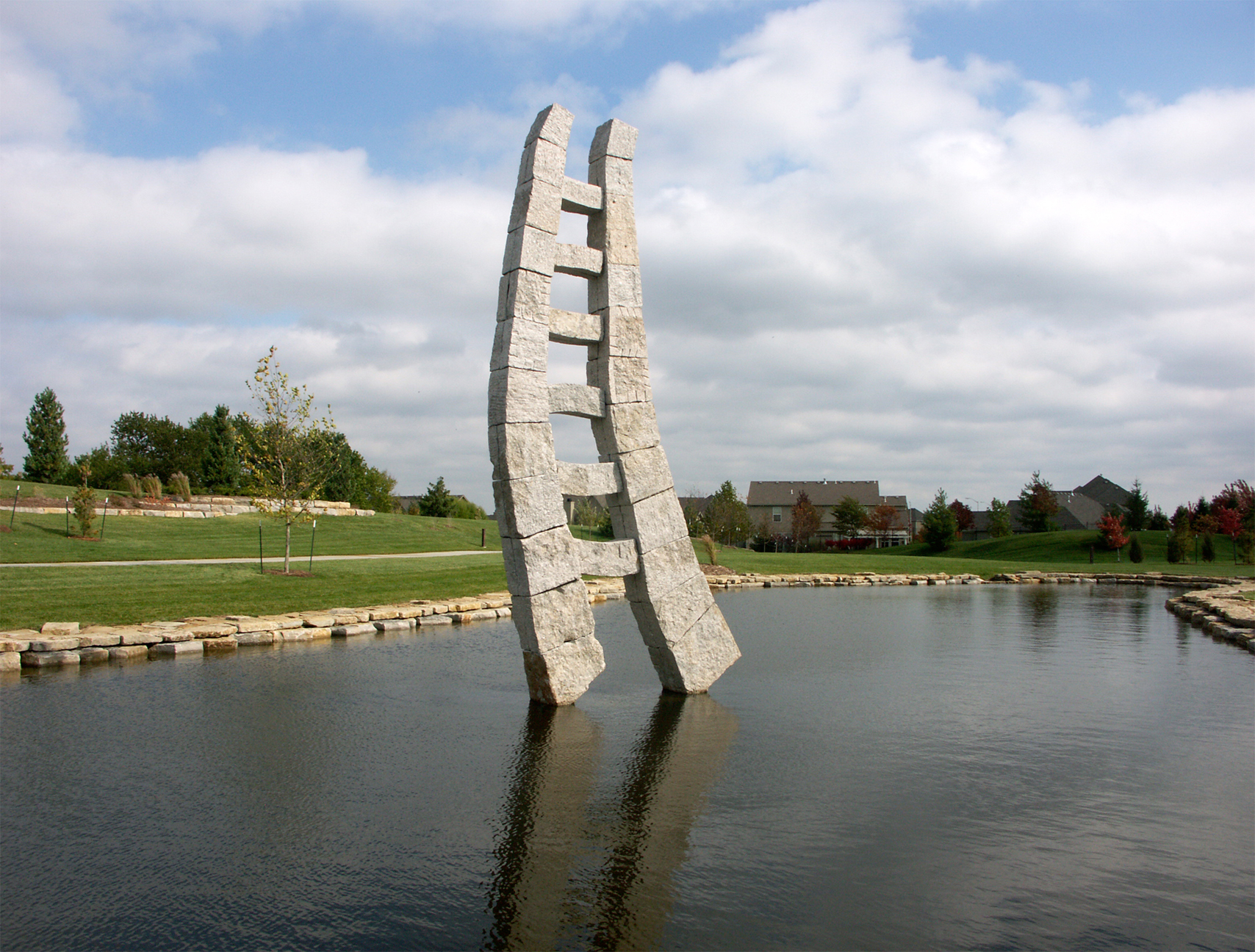
Ilan Averbuch, Avanim Vetseadim, 2008, Leawood, KS.

== Selected works ==
- Songs of Love and Hate (1988), Queens, New York
- Harp, the Sea, and the Quiet Wind (1989), Tel Aviv, Israel
- Deus Ex Machina (1991), Open Museum, Tefen, Israel
- Little Prince (1995), Portland, Oregon
- Terra Incognita (1995), Portland, Oregon
- Divided World (2000), Lavon, Israel
- Dove Tower and the Steps to the Bottom of a Pyramid (2004), Storrs, Connecticut
- The Eye and the Horizon (2006), Stapleton, Colorado
- South Tacoma (2008), Tacoma, Washington
- Landmark (2008), Phoenix, Arizona
- Under the Shadow of a Big Tree (2009), Tamarac, Florida
- The Bell, The Flower, and the Wash (2009), Scottsdale, Arizona
- Avanim Vetseadim (2009), Leawood, Kansas
- Monument for Time (2010), Herriman, Utah
- The House and the Boat (2012), Bellingham, Washington
- Water (2013), El Paso, Texas
- Theater of the Wind (2016), Tempe, Arizona
- Mammoth (2018), Ellensburg, Washington
- The House in the Boat the Boat in the House (2019), Nieheim, Germany
- Tappan Zee (2020), South Nyack, New York
- As Far As The Eyes Can See (2020), Lubbock, Texas
- Ilan Ilan (2020), Ramat Gan, Israel

== Exhibitions ==
Averbuch's work has been exhibited internationally, with major solo exhibitions in the United States, Germany, Israel, France, Switzerland, the Netherlands, and Canada. In the 1980s, Averbuch exhibited with OK Harris in New York, with solo exhibitions in 1981, 1983, 1985, and 1987. In 1986, he showed in Berlin Germany at the DAAD Gallery.

In 1997, Averbuch had a mid-career retrospective at The Open Museum in Tefen, Israel featuring 17 sculptures and 10 large drawings collected from Germany, the United States and Israel. Following Averbuch's 1997 exhibition, the Open Museum Tefen purchased three sculptures, Grapes and Other Promises, Deux ex Machina, and The River, and kept them on display. Grapes and Other Promises (1994) depicts a cluster of grapes, alluding to the story of the spies sent by Joshua to explore the Promised Land. This work, which over time has become one of the works most identified with the museum's sculpture garden, touches on the theme of unfulfilled biblical promises, while the ironic title chosen by Averbuch raises the question of whether Israel is indeed the Promised Land.

In 2005, the Katonah Museum of Art exhibits Averbuch's sculptures on the museum's front lawn and in the sculpture garden. The End of Utopia (The Big Balloon is Far), situated in the front of the museum, is an assemblage of wood, glass, and stone. Wooden slats are arranged in a grid mirroring the shape of an aerial balloon, with a basket made of stone blocks that never made it off the ground. His drawings were on view in the Pryor Gallery until November 2005. The drawings mark the process of creating sculptures, a place to work out ideas and to integrate the site-specific works into the environment they are to occupy.

An exhibition at the Open Museum in Omer from 2013 to 2015 brought together a selection of outdoor sculptures previously displayed in various sites around the world. The exhibition combines large sculptural installation of six monumental outdoor sculptures with works that are on permanent display that have remained in the garden following Averbuch's 1997 exhibition. In 2017, Nancy Hoffman Gallery in New York hosted the solo exhibition "The Lily Pond," an immersive installation consisting of 14 sculptures.

In 2026, the Nancy Hoffman Gallery is showing "After the Fire," a solo exhibit after a fire in the artist's home and studio that year. It features sculptures including Red Moon, Grief (Masks), and It Is Not.
