= The Raven (paintings) =

Series of watercolor paintings by Nabil Kanso

The Raven, watercolor, 30 X 22.5 inches (76 X 57 cm), 1995

The Raven is a series of 28 watercolor paintings made by Nabil Kanso in 1995. The subjects of the works in the series are based on the 1845 poem "The Raven" by Edgar Allan Poe.
