= 1st Armoured Division Memorial =

Monument in Warsaw, Poland

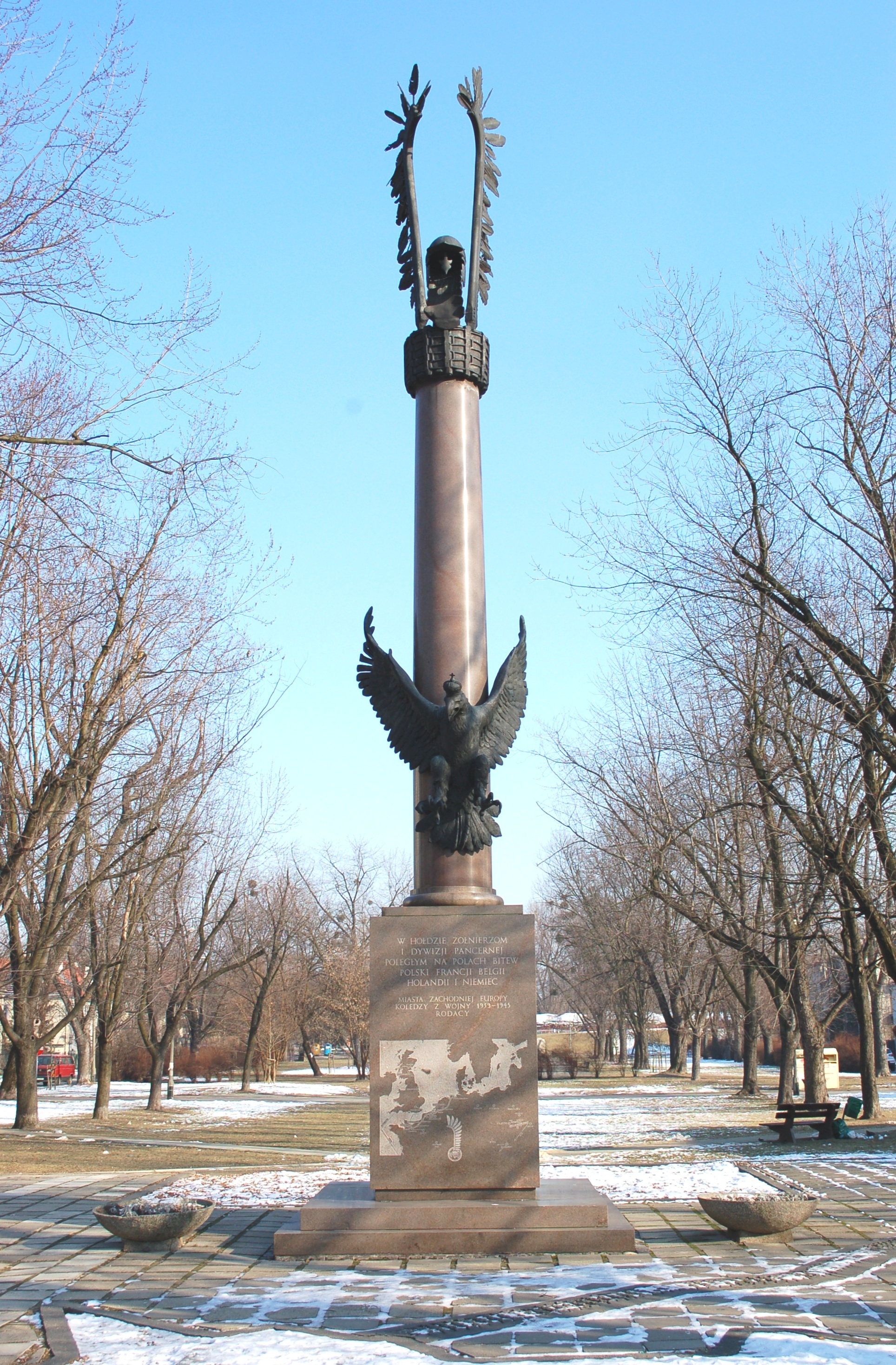
- The monument in 2012
- Interactive map of 1st Armoured Division Memorial
- Location: Invalids Square, Żoliborz, Warsaw, Poland
- Coordinates: 52°15′50.79″N 20°59′32″E
- Designer: Jerzy Sikorski; Andrzej Kiciński
- Type: Sculpture
- Opening date: 30 September 1995
- Dedicated to: 1st Armoured Division

The 1st Armoured Division Memorial (Polish: Pomnik 1 Dywizji Pancernej) is a monument in Warsaw, Poland, located on Invalids Square, at the intersection with Polish Armed Forces Avenue, within the neighbourhood of Old Żoliborz. It is dedicated to the 1st Armoured Division of the Polish Armed Forces in the West, which fought on the Western Front of the Second World War, participating in the Allied liberation of Belgium, France, and the Netherlands. The monument was designed by sculptor Jerzy Sikorski and architect Andrzej Kiciński, and was unveiled on 30 September 1995. It is in the form of a column on a pedestal. It features a sculpture of an eagle with spread wings, mounted at ⅓ of the height of the column, and the sculpture of a helmet and wings of a Polish hussar, which were the symbols of the divisions, and the tank tracked treads wrapped around the column.

== History ==
The monument was dedicated to the 1st Armoured Division of the Polish Armed Forces in the West, which fought on the Western Front of the Second World War, including participating in the Allied liberation of Belgium, France, and the Netherlands. It was designed by sculptor Jerzy Sikorski and architect Andrzej Kiciński. The monument was financed by forty cities and towns in Belgium, France, the Netherlands, and the United Kingdom, and by the war veterans. It was unveiled on 30 September 1995 in Warsaw, Poland, on Invalids Square, at the intersection with Polish Armed Forces Avenue.

== Characteristics ==
Monument is placed on Invalids Square, at the intersection with Polish Armed Forces Avenue. It consists of a column with a sculpture of an eagle with spread wings, mounted at the ⅓ of its height. The top of the column is crowned with sculptures of helmet and wings of a Polish hussar, elements taken from the emblem of the 1st Armoured Division, together with tank tracked treads, wrapped around the top of a column.

The pedestal bears inscriptions, coats of arms and other commemorative elements. It includes:

- on the front: Polish-language inscription which reads: "W hołdzie żołnierzom I Dywizji Pancernej poległym na polach bitew Polski, Francji, Belgii, Holandii i Niemiec. Miasta Zachodniej Europy, koledzy z wojny 1939-1945, rodacy, and translates to "In tribute to the soldiers of the 1st Armoured Division fallen on the battlefields of Poland, France, Belgium, the Netherlands, and Germany. Cities of Western Europe, colleagues from the war of 1939–1945, brethren", and a map of Europe depicting the timeline of division's travel;
- on the right side: coat of arms of Belgium and the Netherlands, and below, the coats of arms and names of the financing entities; including from Belgium: Ghent, Sint-Niklaas, Beveren, Maldegem, Aalter, Ypres, Poperinge, Beerse, Lokeren, Roeselare, Willebroek, Stekene, and Tielt; and from the Netherlands: North Brabant, Breda, Nieuw-Ginneken, Geertruidenberg, Axel, Hulst, Alphen en Riel, Baarle-Nassau, Gilze en Rijen, Oosterhout, Zevenbergen, Hontenisse, Vogelwaarde, Teteringen, Reiderland, Terheijden, Terneuzen, and Zaamslag;
- on the back: inscriptions in Polish and English which read respectively: "Żołnierz polski walczy o wolność wszystkich narodów, ale umiera tylko dla Polski" and "The Polish soldier fights for freedom of other nations, but dies only for Poland", with the earlier also citing the author of the quote as "gen. Stanisław Maczek, dowódca I Dywizji Pancernej", which means: "General Stanisław Maczek, the commander of the 1st Armoured Division";
- and on the left side: coat of arms of the United Kingdom and France, and below, the coats of arms and names of the financing entities, including from the United Kingdom: Edinburgh, Dundee, Perth, Bridlington, Duns; and from France: Orne, Mont-Ormel, "Maczuga", Chambois, Vimoutiers, Criquebeuf-sur-Seine, Saint-Omer, Abbeville, and Caen.

== Gallery ==
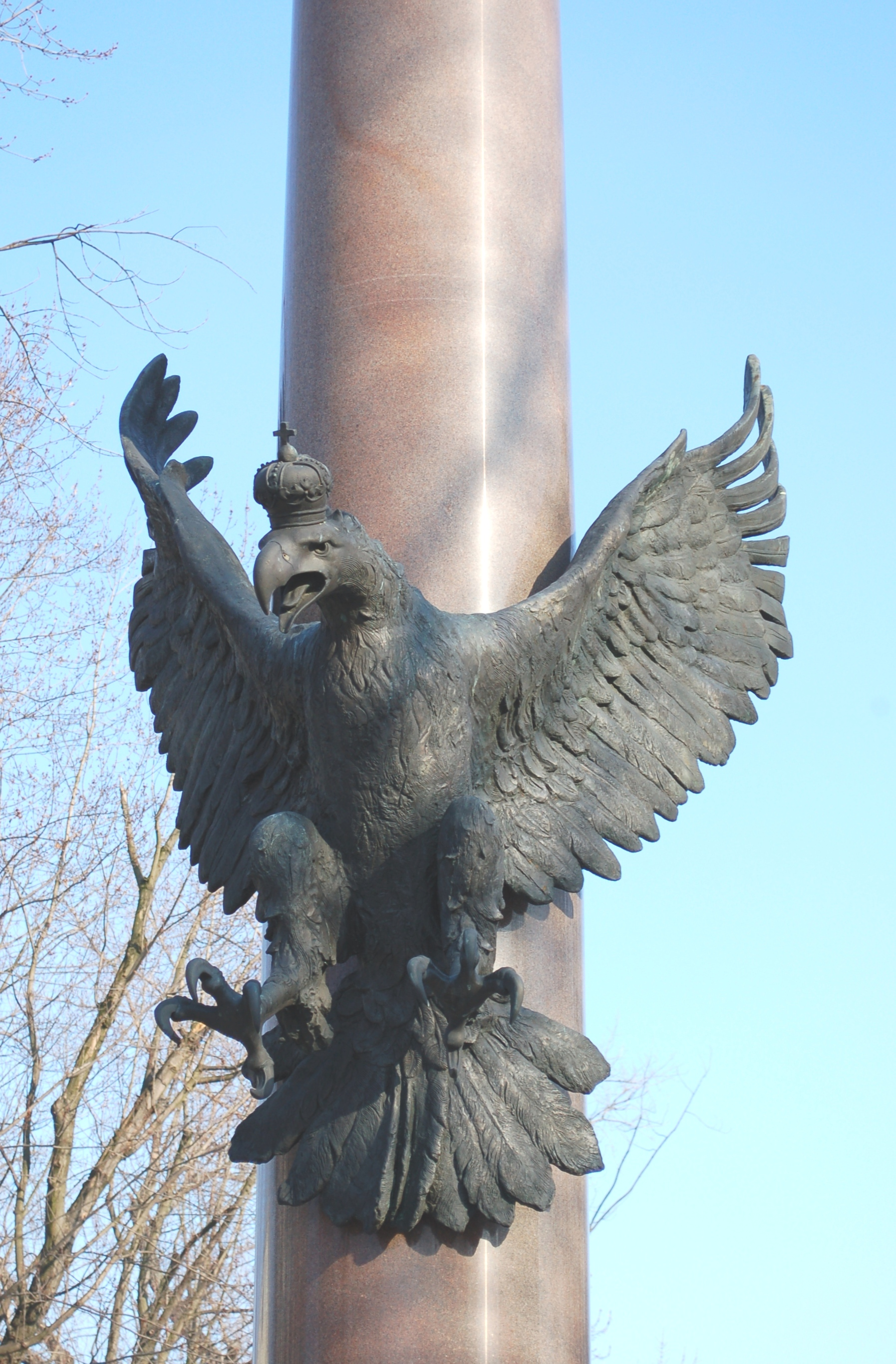
The front of the eagle sculpture on the column.

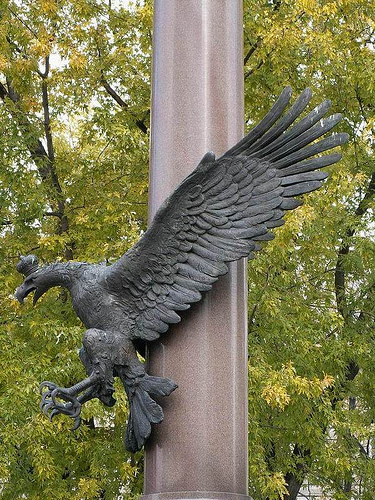
The side of the eagle sculpture on the column.

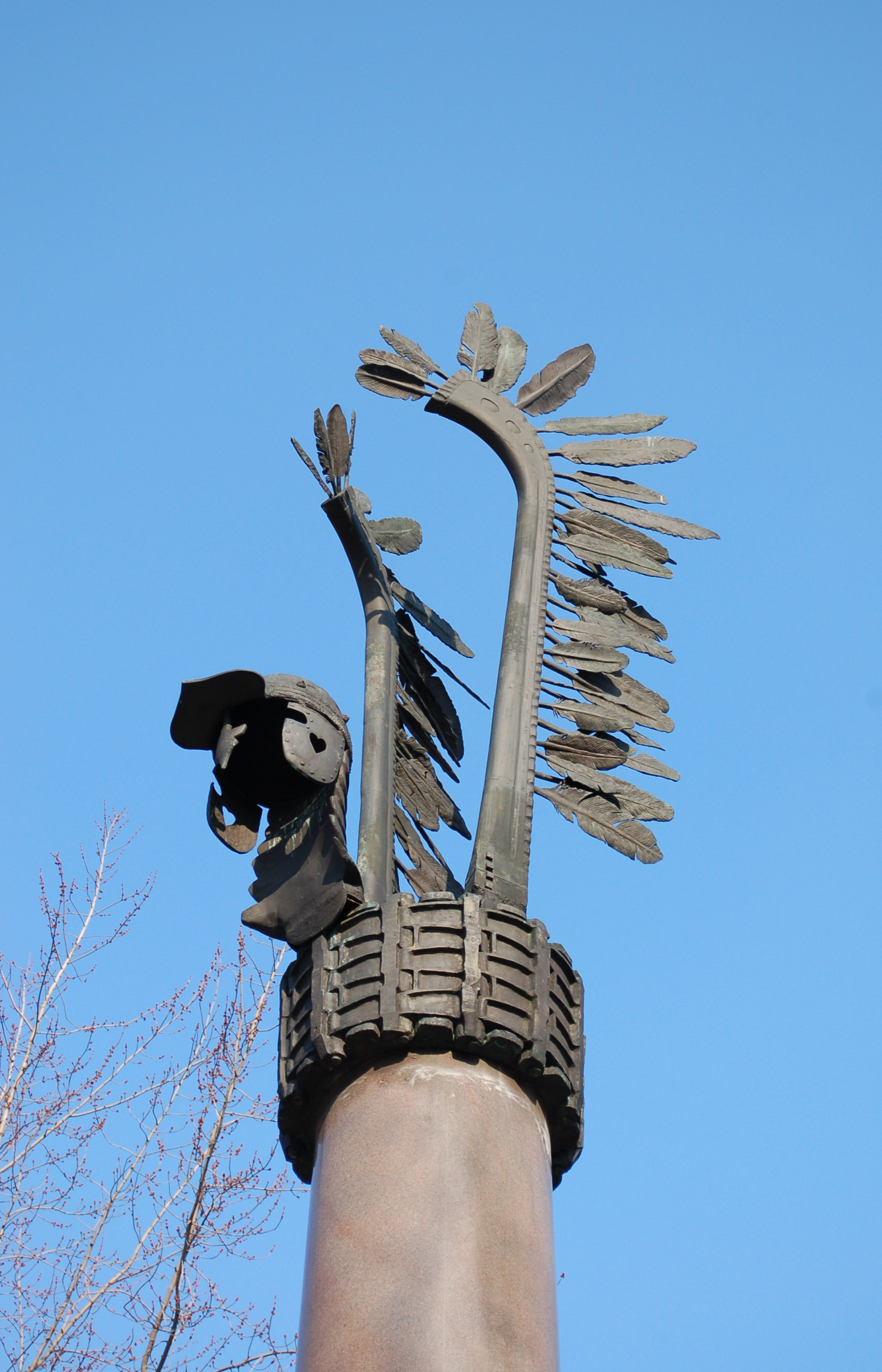
The sculpture at the top of the column.

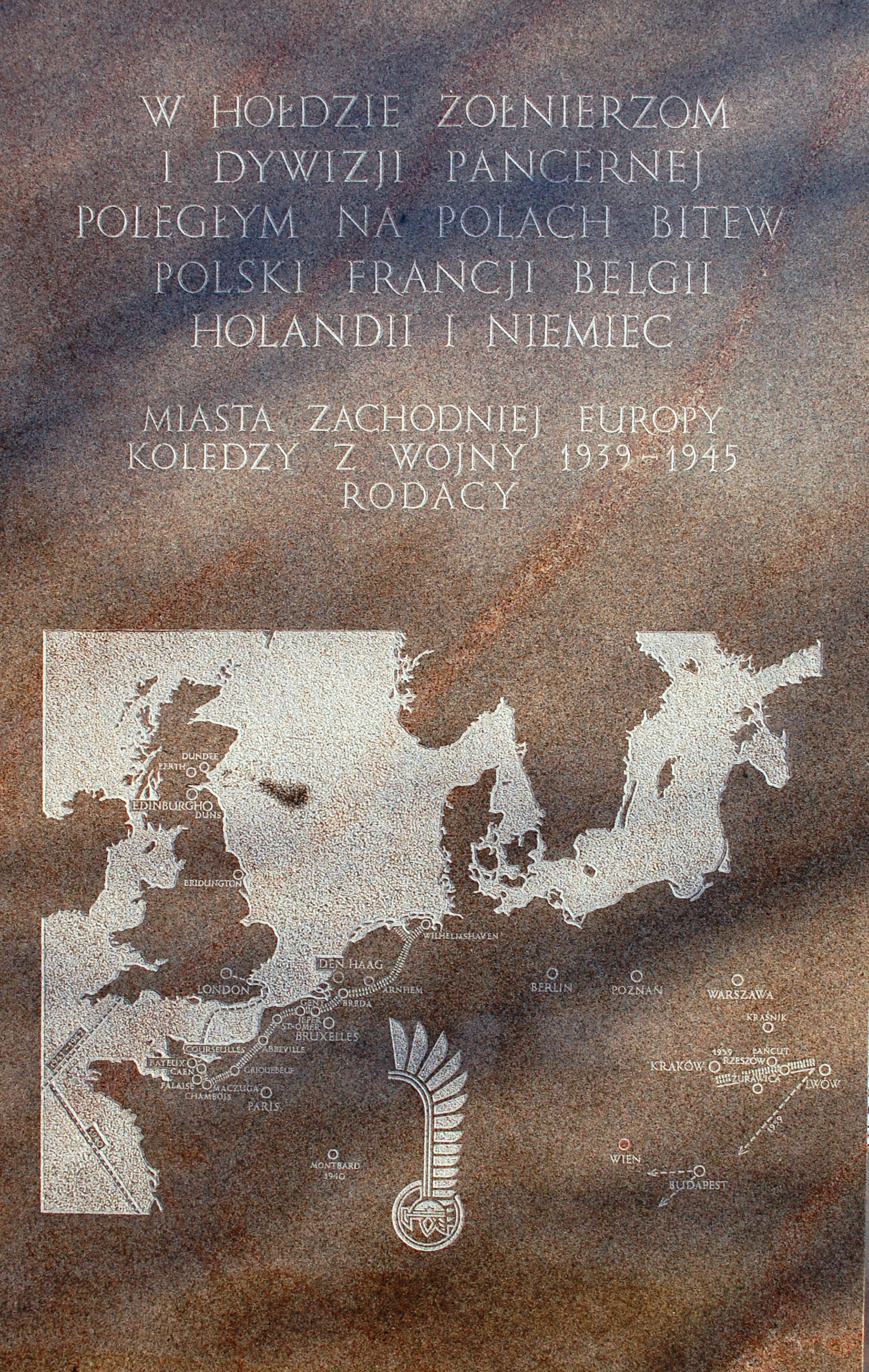
The front side of the pedestal.

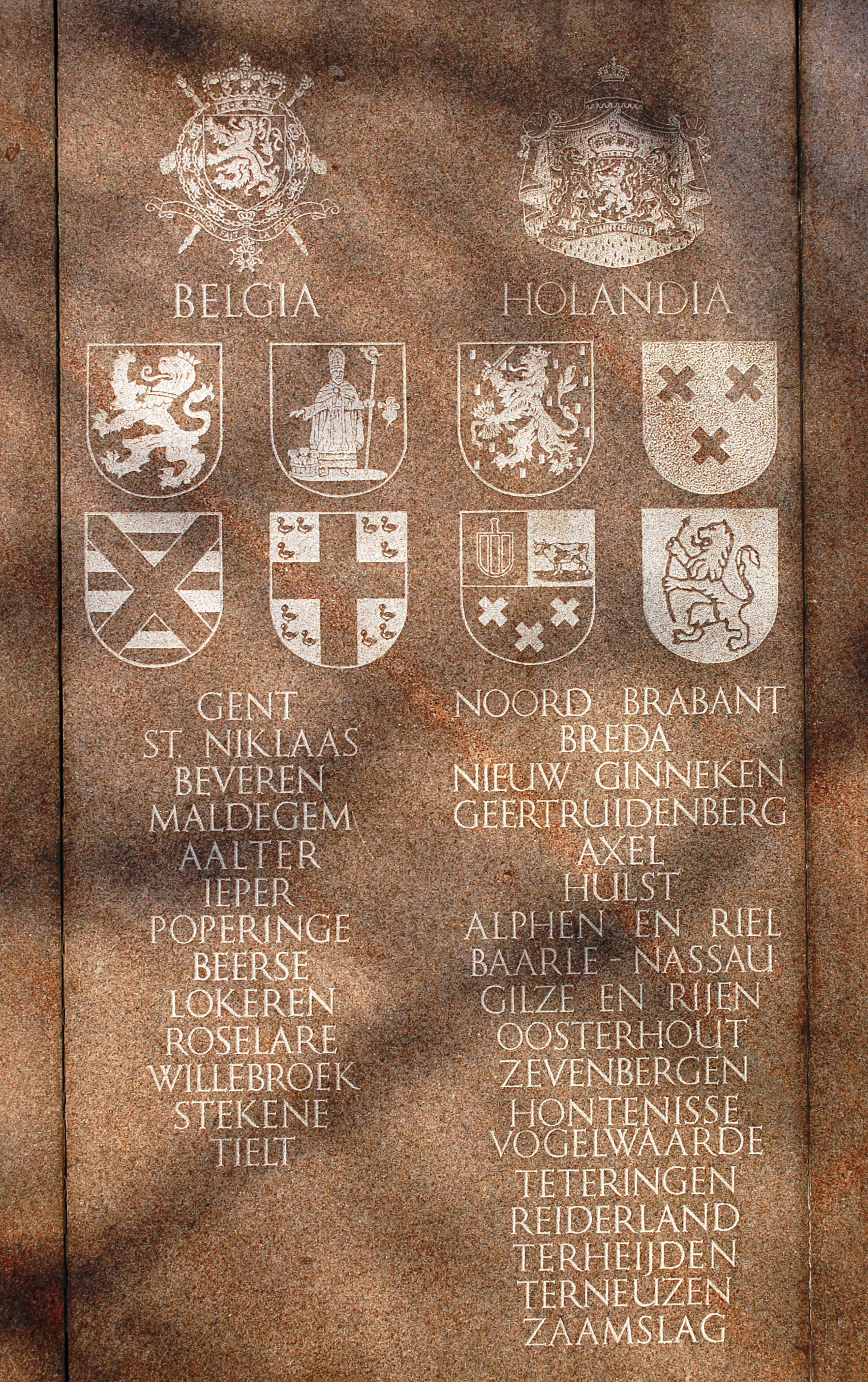
The right side of the pedestal.

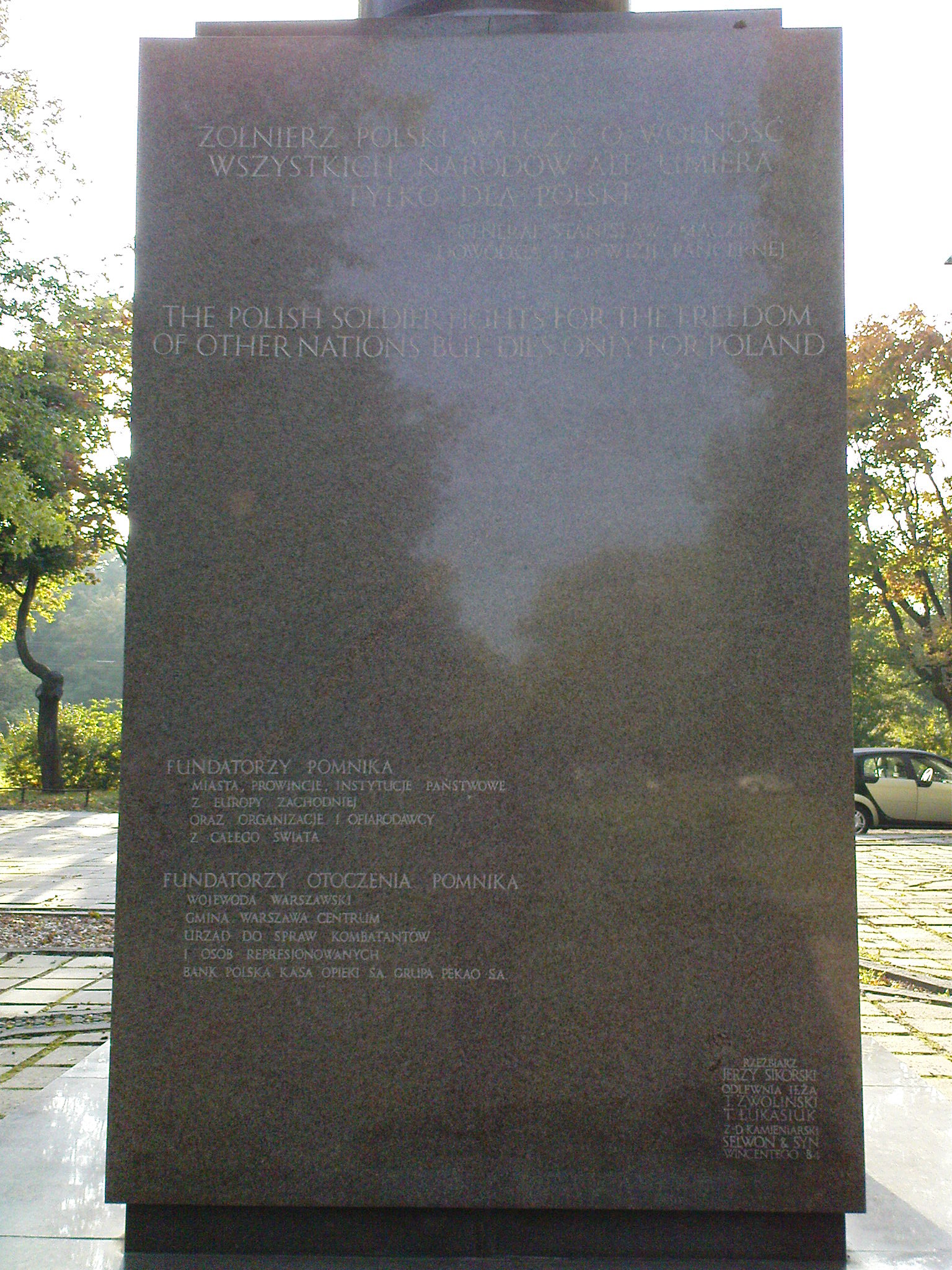
The back side of the pedestal.

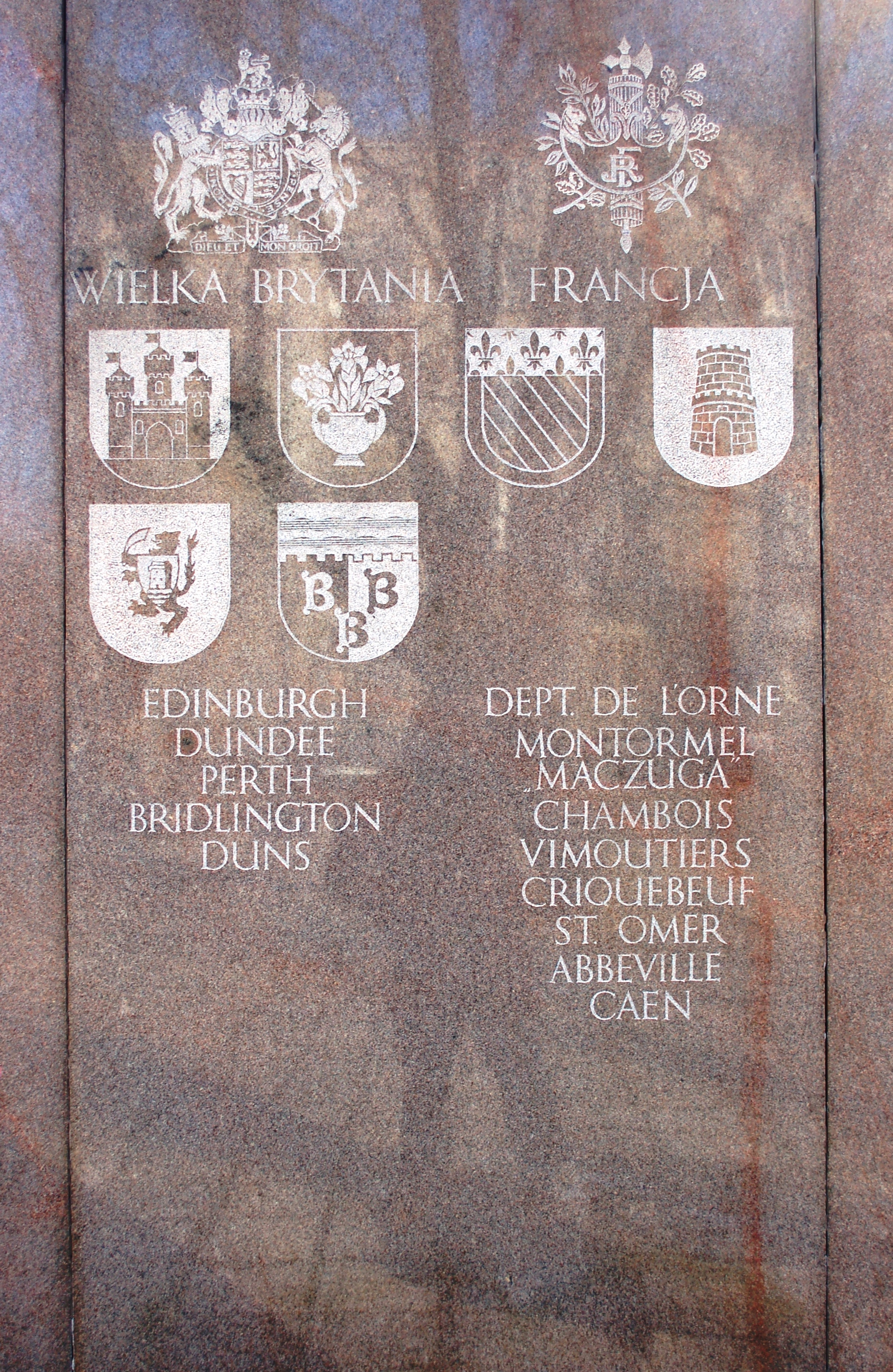
The left side of the pedestal.

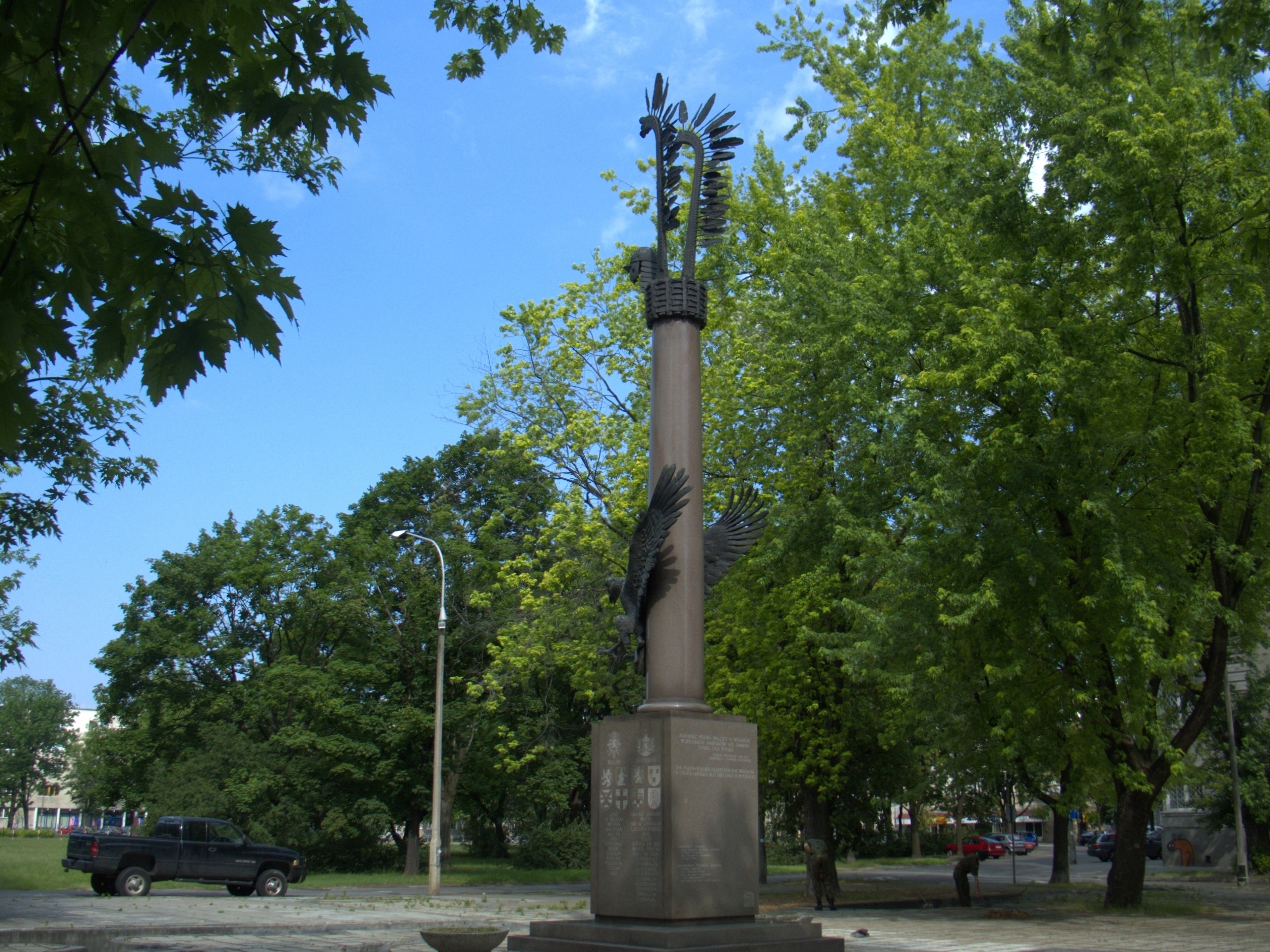
The back of the monument.

== See also ==
- General Stanisław Sosabowski Memorial, another Second World War memorial located nearby on Polish Armed Forces Avenue in Warsaw
