= 11th Armoured Cavalry Division =

11th "Lubuska" Armoured Cavalry Division
- 11 Lubuska Dywizja Kawalerii Pancernej
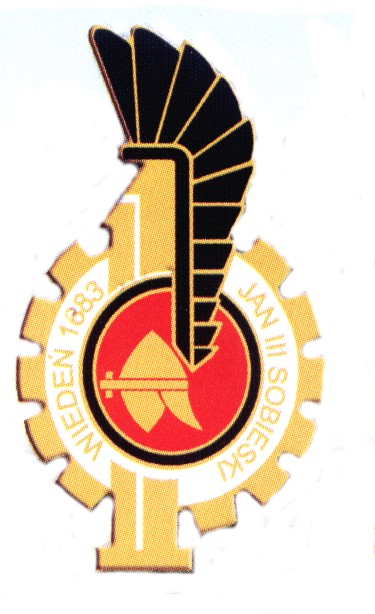
- Distinctive unit insignia
- Active: 1949–present
- Country: Poland
- Branch: Polish Land Forces
- Type: Armoured division
- Role: armoured warfare
- Size: 14,000 soldiers
- Garrison/HQ: Żagań
- Nickname: Lubuska
- Patron: Jan III Sobieski
- Anniversaries: September 12th
- Equipment: Leopard 2A5, Leopard 2A4, PT-91 Twardy; BMP-1.

Insignia
- Shoulder sleeve insignia (former; until June 2020)

- Shoulder sleeve insignia (current; since July 2020)

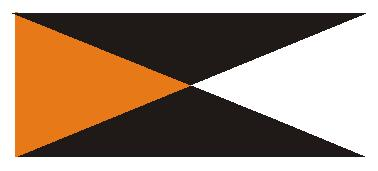
- Beret flash

The 11th "Lubuska" Armoured Cavalry Division (Polish: 11 Lubuska Dywizja Kawalerii Pancernej) is an armoured division of the Polish Land Forces, which traces its history to the formation of the 11th Infantry Division of the Polish Armed Forces in the East in 1945.

== History ==
The 11th Armoured Cavalry Division draws its history in a straight line from the formation in March and April 1945, in the region of Łódź of the 11th Infantry Division.

In March 1949, on the basis of the 11th Infantry Division, the 6th Tank Regiment, and the 25th Armored Artillery Regiment, the 11th Motorised Infantry Division was formed. The division became a part of the 2nd Armoured Corps. The 11th Motorised Infantry Division was authorized 10,028 soldiers, 76 medium tanks, 21 assault guns, 5 armoured cars, 73 76-mm artillery pieces, 26 122-mm howitzers, 90 82-mm mortars, and 60 120-mm mortars. This unit was structured and quartered as:

11th Motorised Infantry Division (1949)

Division Headquarters and Staff - Żary

- 29th Motorised Infantry Regiment - Jelenia Góra
- 40th Motorised Infantry Regiment - Bolesławiec
- 42nd Motorised Infantry Regiment - Żary
- 8th Medium Tank Regiment - Żagań
- 33rd Light Artillery Regiment - Żary
- 92nd Antitank Artillery Regiment - Bolesławiec
- 17th Mortar Regiment - Żagań
- 15th Anti-Aircraft Artillery Battalion - Żagań
- 9th Reconnaissance Battalion - Żagań
- 16th Sapper Battalion - Żary
- 34th Signal Battalion - Żary
- 44th Motor Transport Company - Żary
- Vehicle repair workshops 10, 11, and 12 - Żary

In 1950 the division was reorganized as the 11th "Dresden" Mechanised Division, and authorized 7,636 soldiers, 138 medium tanks, 19 assault guns, 15 armoured cars, 26 122-mm howitzers, 40 76-mm artillery pieces, nine 57-mm antitank guns, 21 37-mm anti-aircraft guns, 40 82-mm mortars, and 54 120-mm mortars. On September 4, 1956, the 2nd Armoured Corps headquarters stood down and the 11th Division was subordinated to the command of the Silesian Military District. This iteration was structured and quartered as:

11th Mechanised Division (1950)

Division Headquarters and Staff - Żagań

- 29th Mechanised Infantry Regiment - Żagań
- 42nd Mechanised Infantry Regiment - Żary
- 67th Mechanised Infantry Regiment - Opole
- 8th "Dresden" Medium Tank Regiment - Żagań
- 33rd Light Artillery Regiment - Żary
- 92nd Antitank Artillery Regiment - Bolesławiec
- 17th Mortar Regiment - Żagań
- 15th Anti-Aircraft Artillery Battalion - Żagań
- 9th Reconnaissance Battalion - Żagań
- 16th Sapper Battalion - Żary
- 34th Signal Battalion - Żagań
- 44th Motor Transport Company - Żagań
- Vehicle repair workshop 10 - Żagań
- Vehicle repair workshops 11 and 12 - Żary

In summer 1957 the reorganization of the division was carried out, and in April 1963 it reorganized as the 11th Armoured Division. In August and September 1968, the 11th Armoured Division was one of the Polish units that took part in the Warsaw Pact invasion of Czechoslovakia. The 11th Armoured Division was structured and quartered as:

11th Armoured Division (1989)

Division Headquarters and Staff - Żagań

- 3rd Medium Tank Regiment - Żagań
- 8th Medium Tank Regiment - Żagań
- 29th "Dresden" Medium Tank Regiment - Żagań
- 42nd Mechanised Infantry Regiment - Żary
- 33rd Light Artillery Regiment - Żary
- 66th Anti-Aircraft Artillery Regiment - Bolesławiec
- 10th Tactical Rocket Artillery Battalion - Żary (9K52 ŁUNA-M rockets)
- 43rd Rocket Artillery Battalion - Żary (BM-21 Grad rockets)
- 9th Reconnaissance Battalion - Żagań
- 16th Sapper Battalion - Żary
- 11th Supply Battalion - Żagań
- 11th Maintenance Battalion - Żagań
- 34th Signal Battalion - Żagań
- 60th Medical Battalion - Żagań
- 17th Chemical Company - Żagań
- Military Police Company - Żagań

In 1990 the division was reorganized as the 11th Mechanised Division. In September 1991 the division lost the distinguished name "Dresden". In July 1992, the type-designation "armoured cavalry" was granted, although the division was eventually restructured as a regular armoured division. The new type designation recalled the service of pre-war and Second World War Western Front Polish armoured units. The designation "armoured cavalry" and unit badge depicting a black hussar wing and helmet reference the historical winged hussars, the Polish heavy shock cavalry from the 16th to 18th centuries. The badge is an updated version of the badge of the Polish 1st Armored Division (1942-1947). The Division's patron Jan III Sobieski personally led the winged hussars at the Battle of Vienna in 1683 and the Division inherited the battle honour Vienna 1683, inscribed on the unit's commemorative badge, in 1989.

== Structure ==
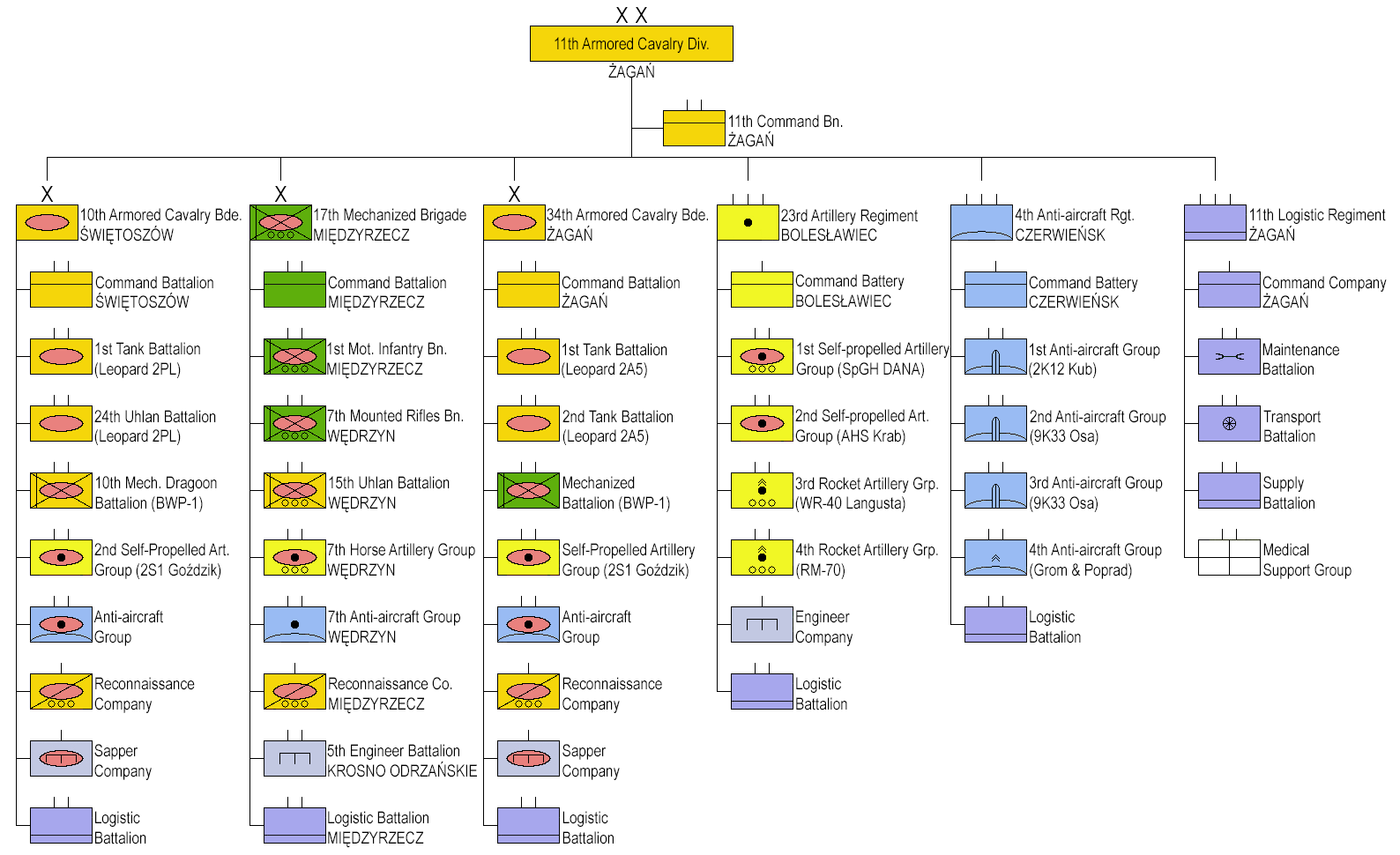
11th Armoured Cavalry Division Structure (click image to enlarge)

11th Armoured Cavalry Division units 2020 (11th Logistic Regiment based with Division HQ)

As of 2020, the division is organised in this manner:

- 11th Armoured Cavalry Division
  - Divisional Headquarters and 11th Headquarters Battalion in Żagań
  - 10th Armoured Cavalry Brigade in Świętoszów
  - 17th Mechanized Brigade in Międzyrzecz
  - 34th Armoured Cavalry Brigade in Żagań
  - 4th Anti-Aircraft Regiment in Czerwieńsk
  - 23rd Artillery Regiment in Bolesławiec
  - 11th Logistic Regiment in Żagań

== Bibliography ==
- Wiesław Chłopek, 11 Lubuska Dywizja Kawalerii Pancernej im. Króla Jana III Sobieskiego. Zarys dziejów, Wydawnictwo "Chroma", Żary 2005, wyd. I, ISBN 83-922412-3-1
- Zdzisław Sawicki, Mundur i odznaki Wojska Polskiego. Czas przemian, Warszawa: Bellona, 1997
