= 2nd Armoured Regiment (Poland) =

1940–1945 combat formation of the Polish Army

- 2nd Polish Armoured Regiment Patch
- Active: 29 January 1940 – 25 June 1940; 13 November 1942 – May 1945
- Country: Poland
- Role: Armoured warfare
- Engagements: World War II: Battle of France; Normandy Campaign

Poland raised the 2nd Polish Armoured Regiment in France on 29 January 1940 as the 2nd Tank Battalion and fought under this title in the French campaign of 1940. Members of the regiment reformed in Scotland on 13 November 1942 after the fall of France adopting the designation of 2nd Armoured Regiment. The reconstituted unit returned to France in late July 1944 as a part of the 10th Armoured Cavalry Brigade, 1st (Polish) Armoured Division. . Its most memorable action in Normandy being it first, one fought at Saint-Aignan on 8 August 1944; a battle which is still commemorated annually by the regiment.

Following the Normandy campaign the unit saw action in Belgium, the Netherlands and Germany. The cease-fire in May 1945 found them in northwestern Germany.

Today the traditions of the regiment are continued by the modern 10th (Polish) Armoured Brigade stationed in Świętoszów, Poland.

== Sources ==
- Canadian War Museum
