= Stalag VIII-E =

German World War II prisoner-of-war camp in Świętoszów, Poland

Stalag VIII-E (308) / Stalag VIII C/Z
- Neuhammer (Świętoszów), Lower Silesia

Site information
- Type: Prisoner-of-war camp
- Controlled by: Nazi Germany

Location
- Neuhammer, Germany (pre-war borders, 1937) Stalag VIII-E (308) / Stalag VIII C/Z (Germany)
- Coordinates: 51.4760°N 15.4042°E

Site history
- In use: 1939–1945
- Battles/wars: World War II

Garrison information
- Occupants: Polish and French, then Soviet POW

Stalag VIII-E (also known as Stalag 308) was a German World War II prisoner-of-war camp located next to the village of Neuhammer, Silesia (now Świętoszów, Poland). It was about 15 km (9.3 mi) south of the camps Stalag VIII-C and Stalag Luft III at Sagan, Silesia (now Żagań, Poland). It was built on a large German Army training ground that is still in use today by the Polish Land Forces' 10th Armoured Cavalry Brigade. It housed Polish, French, and Soviet POWs.

== Camp history ==
The camp was built in September 1939 to house several thousand prisoners from the invasion of Poland. After May 1940, they were joined by French prisoners taken during the Battle of France. In July 1941, the Poles and French were transferred to other camps, and were replaced with Soviet prisoners. In June 1942, Stalag VIII-E became a sub-camp (Zweiglager) of Stalag VIII-C and was renamed Stalag VIII-C/Z. During the war, a total of 57,545 Soviet POWs were held at the camp. The camp was liberated by the Red Army on 15 February 1945.

Post-war the camp was used by the Soviets to hold German Army and Polish Home Army prisoners before their transfer to Russia.

== Memorial ==
In 1961, a monument was erected at the cemetery next to the site of Stalag VIII-C in remembrance of the thousands who died there. In 1971, the "Museum to the Martyrdom of Allied Prisoners of War" was established on the site of the camp to house mementos and records of both Stalag VIII-C and Stalag Luft III, as well as Stalag VIII-E.

== See also ==
- List of prisoner-of-war camps in Germany
