= 1st Armoured Regiment =

1st Armoured Regiment may refer to:

- 1st Armoured Regiment (Australia)
- 1st Armoured Regiment (Poland) (1939—1946)
- 1st Armoured Regiment (china) (1951—1960)
- 1st Armoured Regiment (india) (1939—1946)
