= 3rd Polish Infantry Brigade =

- Badge of the 1st Armoured Division
- Active: 1942–1947
- Country: Poland
- Branch: Land forces
- Type: Infantry
- Role: Shock troops
- Part of: 1st Polish Armoured Division
- Nickname(s): Black Division
- Engagements: Operation Totalize; Mont Ormel; Hill 262; Battle of Falaise; Battle of Breda

Commanders
- Notable commanders: Marian Wieronski

The 3rd Polish Infantry Brigade (3 Brygada Strzelców) was a Polish infantry brigade which served during World War II. Together with the 10th Armoured Cavalry Brigade they formed part of the 1st Polish Armoured Division and was created from Polish soldiers who had already escaped from Poland to France, and after the fall of France made their way to Great Britain. Their wartime headquarters were in Biggar High School, South Lanarkshire

== Formation ==
3rd Polish Infantry Brigade (3 Brygada Strzelców) - Col. Marian Wieroński:

- 1st Polish Highland Battalion (1 batalion Strzelców Podhalańskich) - Lt.Col. K. Complak
- 8th Polish Rifle Battalion (8 batalion strzelców) - Lt.Col. Aleksander Nowaczyński
- 9th Polish Rifle Battalion (9 batalion strzelców flandryjskich) - Lt.Col. Zdzisław Szydłowski

=== Normandy ===
By the end of July 1944 the brigade, together with the rest of 1st Polish Armoured Division, was transferred to Normandy. The final elements arrived on August 1 and the unit was attached to the First Canadian Army. It entered combat on August 8 during Operation Totalize. The division twice suffered serious bombings by Allied aircraft yet it achieved a brilliant victory against the Wehrmacht in the battles for Mont Ormel, Hill 262 and the town of Chambois. This series of offensive and defensive operations came to be known as the Battle of Falaise in which a large number of German Wehrmacht and SS divisions were trapped in the Falaise pocket and subsequently destroyed.

1st Polish Armoured Division, including the 3rd Polish Infantry Brigade had the crucial role of closing the pocket and closing the escape route of the German divisions, hence the fighting was absolutely desperate and the 2nd Polish Armoured, 24th Polish Lancers and 10th Dragoons, supported by the 8th Infantry and 9th Infantry Battalions took the brunt of German attacks trying to break free from the pocket. Surrounded and running out of ammunition they withstood incessant attacks from multiple fleeing panzer divisions for 48 hours until they were relieved.

=== Belgium and the Netherlands ===
After the Allied armies broke out from Normandy, the brigade was involved in the pursuit of the Germans along the coast of the English Channel. It liberated, among others, the towns of Ypres, Ghent and Passchendaele. A successful outflanking manoeuvre planned and performed by General Maczek allowed liberation of the city of Breda without any civilian casualties (October 29, 1944).

The division spent the winter of 1944–1945 on the south bank of the river Rhine, guarding a sector around Moerdijk in the Netherlands. In early 1945 it was transferred to the province of Overijssel and started to push along with the Allies along the Dutch-German border, liberating the eastern parts of the provinces of Drenthe and Groningen with towns such as Emmen, Coevorden and Stadskanaal.

=== Germany ===
In April 1945 the brigade entered Germany in the area of Emsland. On May 6 they seized the Kriegsmarine naval base in Wilhelmshaven, where General Maczek accepted the capitulation of the fortress, naval base, East Frisian Fleet and more than 10 infantry divisions.

Here the division ended the war and was joined by the Polish 1st Independent Parachute Brigade. It undertook occupation duties until 1947, when the division was disbanded, see Haren, Germany. The majority of its soldiers opted not to return to now Soviet occupied Poland and stayed in exile.

== See also ==
- Maczków - Polish town in Emsland
