= 1939 Neuhammer disaster =

1939 German aviation accident

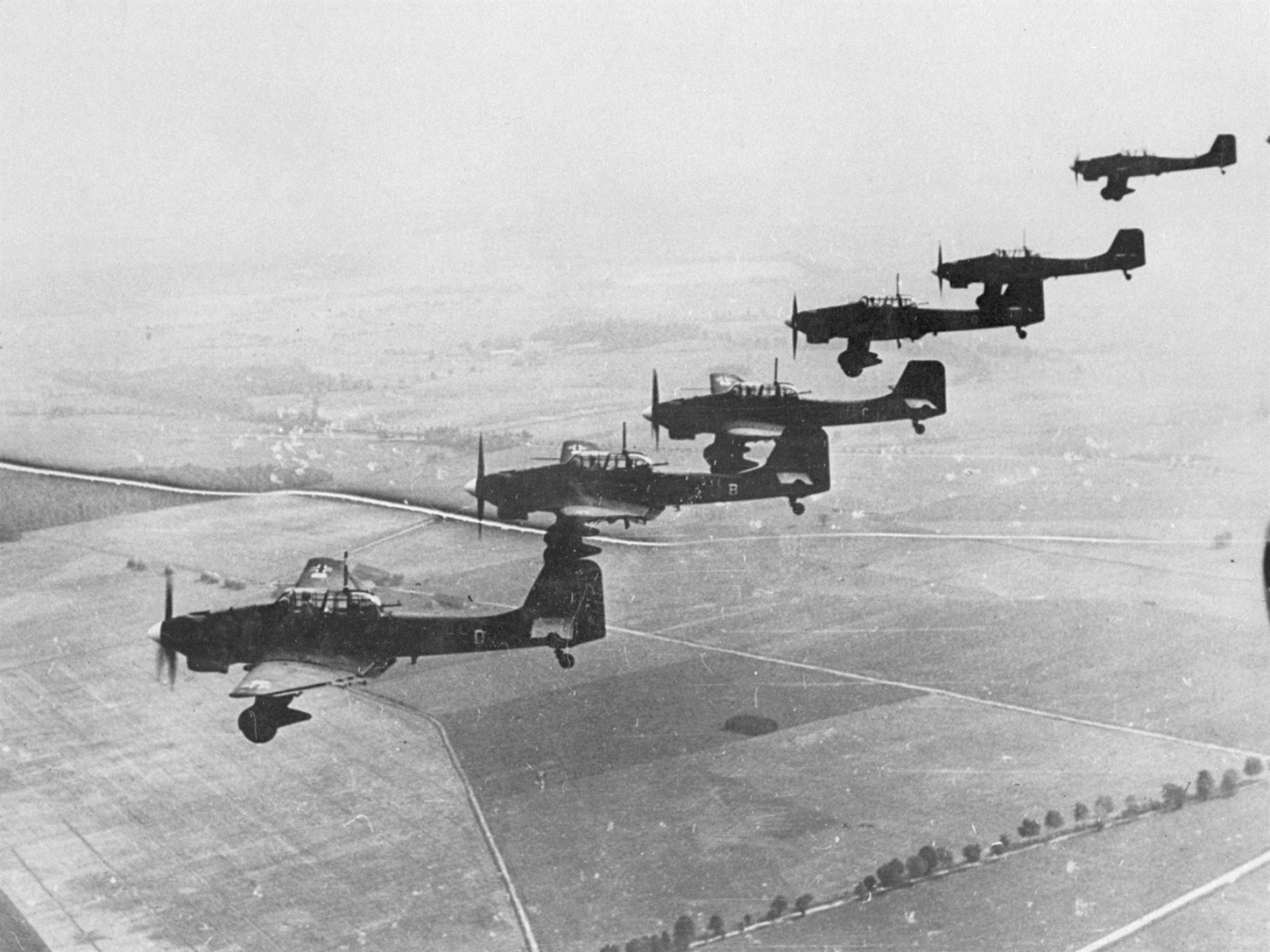
- Similar German Junkers Ju 87 airplanes flying in formation (September 1939)

Occurrence
- Date: 15 August 1939
- Summary: Controlled flight into terrain due to low cloud cover
- Site: Neuhammer training area, Silesia (now Świętoszów, Poland); 51°26′52.080″N 15°29′34.080″E

Aircraft
- Aircraft type: 13x Junkers Ju 87 Stuka
- Operator: Luftwaffe
- Occupants: 26
- Fatalities: 26
- Survivors: 0

The 1939 Neuhammer disaster (German: Stuka-Flugunfall von Neuhammer, also Stuka-Unglück) was the deadliest aviation accident of the German Luftwaffe prior to the Second World War in Świętoszów (in German named Neuhammer at the time).

== Background ==
The Świętoszów (in German named Neuhammer at the time) training area in Silesia was one of the largest military exercise grounds in the German Reich, capable of accommodating large formations of up to 70,000 troops. It was extensively expanded after the Nazi rise to power and used for large-scale combined-arms training exercises.

In mid-August 1939, only weeks before the planned Invasion of Poland, the Luftwaffe organized a large-scale demonstration intended to showcase the effectiveness of the Junkers Ju 87 dive bomber to senior officers.

== Accident ==
On 15 August 1939, near Neuhammer in Silesia, 13 dive bombers Junkers Ju 87 of I Group, Sturzkampfgeschwader 76, under the command of Gruppenkommandeur Hauptmann Walter Sigel, crashed during a demonstration over the Neuhammer training area. All 26 crew members were killed.

The aircraft had departed earlier that morning from an airfield near Cottbus and were tasked with conducting a demonstration dive-bombing attack using practice bombs against clearly marked ground targets.

The objective of the exercise in the area of the Neuhammer training area was an attack on ground targets carried out by a formation of group of dive bombers. Three squadrons, each with nine aircraft, were to execute successive dives with bomb release.

According to operational planning, the aircraft approached at an altitude of about 4,000 metres (approximately 12,000 ft) and were to descend through a cloud layer before visually acquiring their targets and recovering at low altitude.

The weather reconnaissance unit reported one hour before the maneuver: “Cloud bank in target area, two-thirds covered, cloud height 2,000 meters, cloud base at 900 meters, below that good ground visibility.” The approach was conducted at 4,000 meters. During the dive, the aircraft were to penetrate the clouds and acquire the target visually between 300 and 400 meters before pull-out.

In reality, the cloud base at the time of the approach was only around 100 meters, likely due to rapidly forming ground fog. This made it nearly impossible to correctly determine the actual height above ground level and to recover from the dive in time. Additionally, during the steep dive, pilots’ focus on visual target acquisition made it difficult to monitor the altimeter.

At approximately 06:00, Hauptmann Sigel initiated the dive as formation leader. Upon emerging from the cloud layer far lower than expected, he realized the danger and immediately ordered his formation by radio to pull up.

Sigel managed to recover his aircraft at very low altitude, narrowly avoiding impact by passing through a clearing in a forest. However, the aircraft immediately following him crashed into trees or the ground. The second formation of nine aircraft and additional aircraft from the third formation were also unable to recover in time; several experienced an aerodynamic stall during pull-out and crashed.

In total, 13 aircraft were destroyed and all 26 crew members were killed. Columns of smoke rising from the impact sites were visible from above the cloud layer to surviving aircraft.

== Impact ==
The disaster occurred only weeks before the outbreak of the Second World War and briefly raised concerns about the operational use of dive bombers within the Luftwaffe.

Despite the losses, Sturzkampfgeschwader 76 was quickly replenished with replacement aircraft and crews and participated in the invasion of Poland beginning on 1 September 1939.

== Investigation ==
In the subsequent legal investigation, the responsible group commander, Hauptmann Sigel, was acquitted, as he was able to rely on the incorrect report provided by the flight weather service.
