= 1st Armoured Division (Poland) =

Armoured division of the Polish Armed Forces in the West during World War II

1st Armored Division
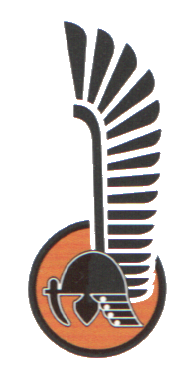
- Emblem of the 1st Armoured Division inspired by the helmet and wings of Polish hussars.
- Active: 1942–1947
- Country: Poland
- Branch: Polish Land Forces
- Type: Armoured
- Size: Division, 18,000 soldiers, 380 tanks, 470 guns
- Nickname: Black devil
- Colors: Black and Orange
- Engagements: World War II: Operation Overlord; Falaise Pocket; Operation Pheasant

Commanders
- Notable commanders: Stanisław Maczek

The 1st Armoured Division (Polish 1 Dywizja Pancerna) was an armoured division of the Polish Armed Forces in the West during World War II. Created in February 1942 at Duns in Scotland, it was commanded by Major General Stanisław Maczek and at its peak numbered approximately 18,000 soldiers. The division served in the final phases of the Battle of Normandy in August 1944 during Operation Totalize and the Battle of Chambois and then continued to fight throughout the campaign in Northern Europe, mainly as part of the First Canadian Army.

== History ==
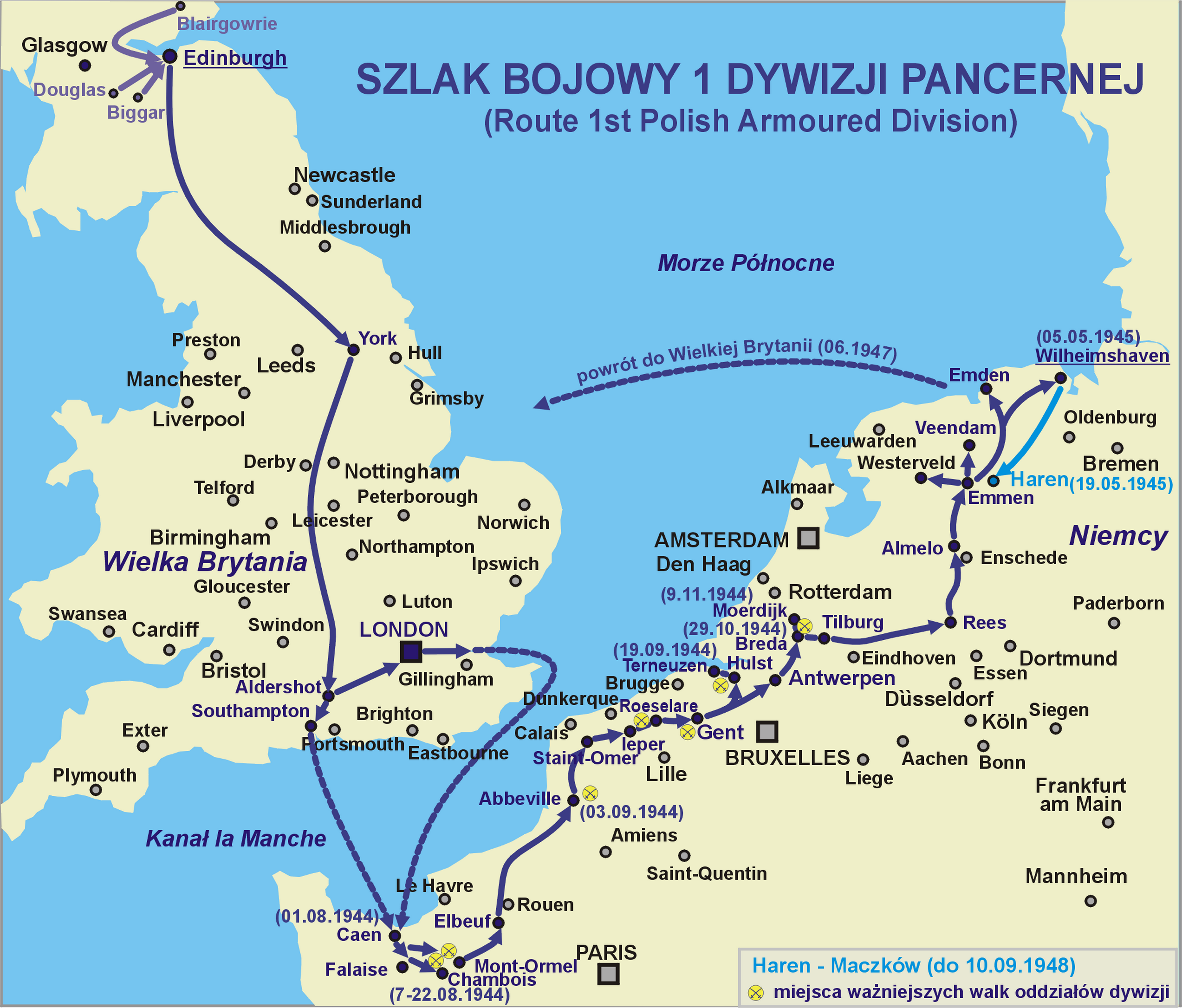
Map of the route taken by the Division during World War II.

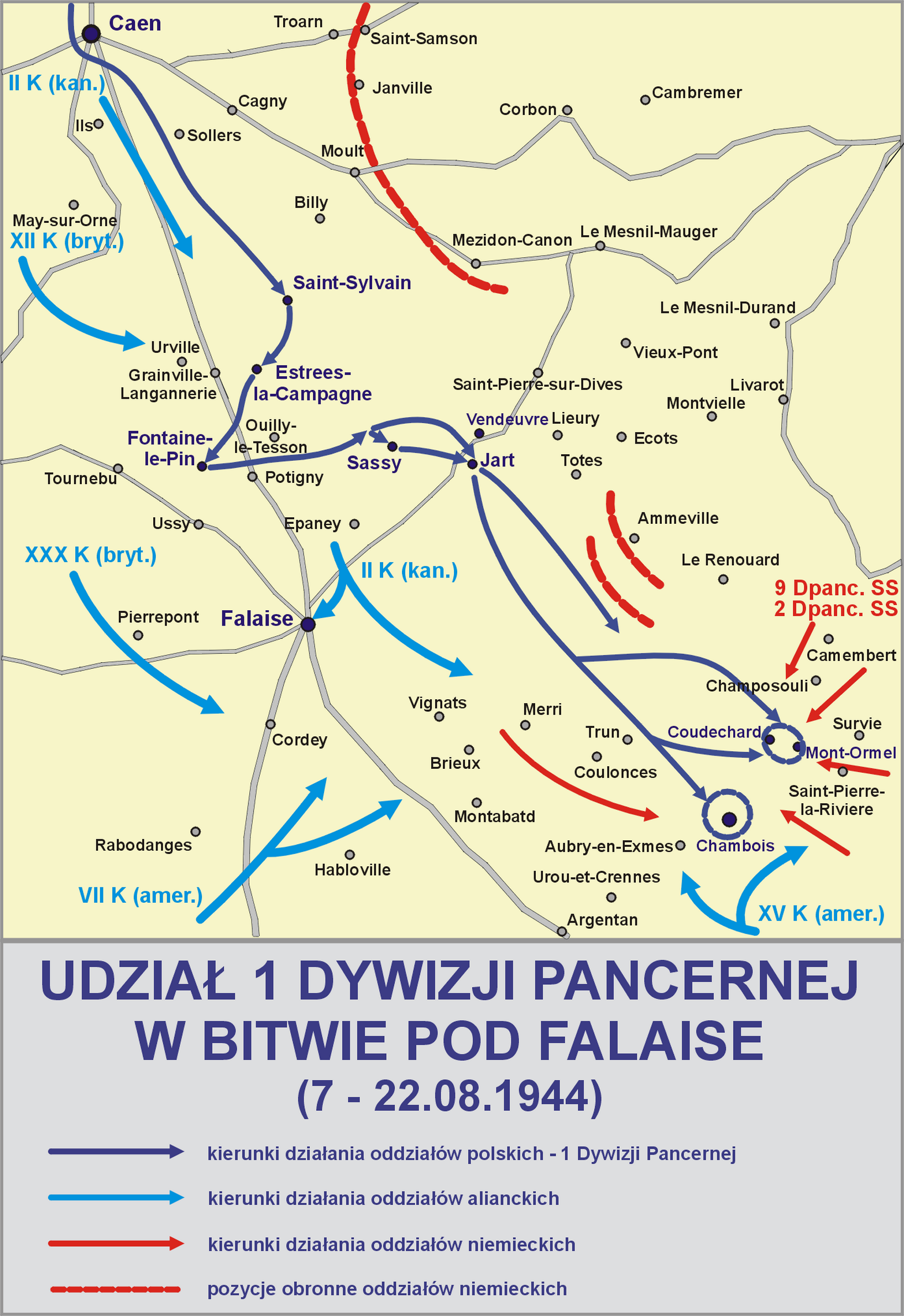
Map of the Division's participation in the Battle of Falaise.

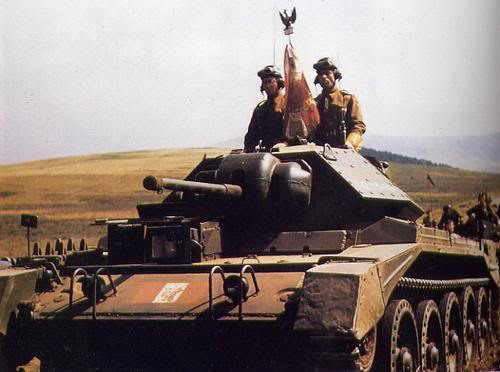
Crusader tank of the 1st Armoured Division near Haddington 1943.

After the fall of Poland and then France in 1940, many of the remaining Poles that had fought in both campaigns retreated with the British Army to the United Kingdom.

=== Formation ===
Stationed in Scotland, the Polish 1st Armoured Division was formed as part of the Polish I Corps under Wladyslaw Sikorski, which guarded approximately 200 kilometres of British coast in 1940-1941. The commander of the Division, General Stanislaw Maczek, was Poland’s premier mechanized commander, and many of his subordinate officers from the unit he commanded in 1939, the 10th Mechanized Brigade, had made their way to Britain with him. They were organized on the British Armoured Division model, equipped with British uniforms, weapons and tanks. They were initially equipped and trained on Crusader tanks but in late 1943 and early 1944 these were replaced with Sherman and Cromwell tanks. They then participated in war games together with the 4th Canadian (Armoured) Division.

=== Normandy ===
Polish Crusader AA MKII tank of the 1st Polish Armoured Regiment near Caen at the beginning of the Falaise operation.

By the end of July 1944, the 1st Armoured had been transferred to Normandy, its final elements arriving on 1 August on Arromanches, Grayes and Courseulles sur mer where a memorial has been erected. The unit was attached to the First Canadian Army as part of the 21st Army Group. This may have been done to help in communication, as the vast majority of Poles did not speak English when they arrived in the United Kingdom from 1940 onwards. The Division entered combat on 8 August during Operation Totalize. It twice suffered serious casualties as a result of "friendly fire" from Allied aircraft, but achieved a victory against the Wehrmacht in the battles for Mont Ormel, and the town of Chambois. This series of offensive and defensive operations came to be known as the Battle of Falaise, in which a large number of German Army and SS divisions were trapped in the Falaise Pocket and subsequently destroyed.

Maczek's division had the crucial role of closing the pocket at the escape route of the trapped German divisions, hence the fighting was desperate and the 2nd Polish Armoured Regiment, 24th Polish Lancers and 10th Dragoons, supported by the 8th and 9th Infantry Battalions, took the brunt of German attacks by units attempting to break free from the pocket. Surrounded and running out of ammunition, they withstood incessant attacks from multiple fleeing panzer divisions for 48 hours until they were relieved. The division's total losses from August 7 when it entered combat until the end of the battle of Falaise on August 22 were 446 killed, 1,501 wounded, and 150 missing, or 2,097 soldiers in total during about two weeks of fighting.

=== Belgium and the Netherlands ===
After the Allied armies broke out from Normandy, the Polish 1st Armoured Division pursued the Germans along the coast of the English Channel. It liberated, among others, the towns of Saint-Omer, Ypres, Oostnieuwkerke, Roeselare, Tielt, Ruislede, and Ghent. During Operation Pheasant, a successful outflanking manoeuvre planned and performed by General Maczek allowed the liberation of the city of Breda without any civilian casualties (29 October 1944). The Division spent the winter of 1944-1945 on the south bank of the river Rhine, guarding a sector around Moerdijk, Netherlands. In early 1945, it was transferred to the province of Overijssel and started to push with the Allies along the Dutch-German border, liberating the eastern parts of the provinces of Drenthe and Groningen including the towns of Emmen, Coevorden and Stadskanaal.

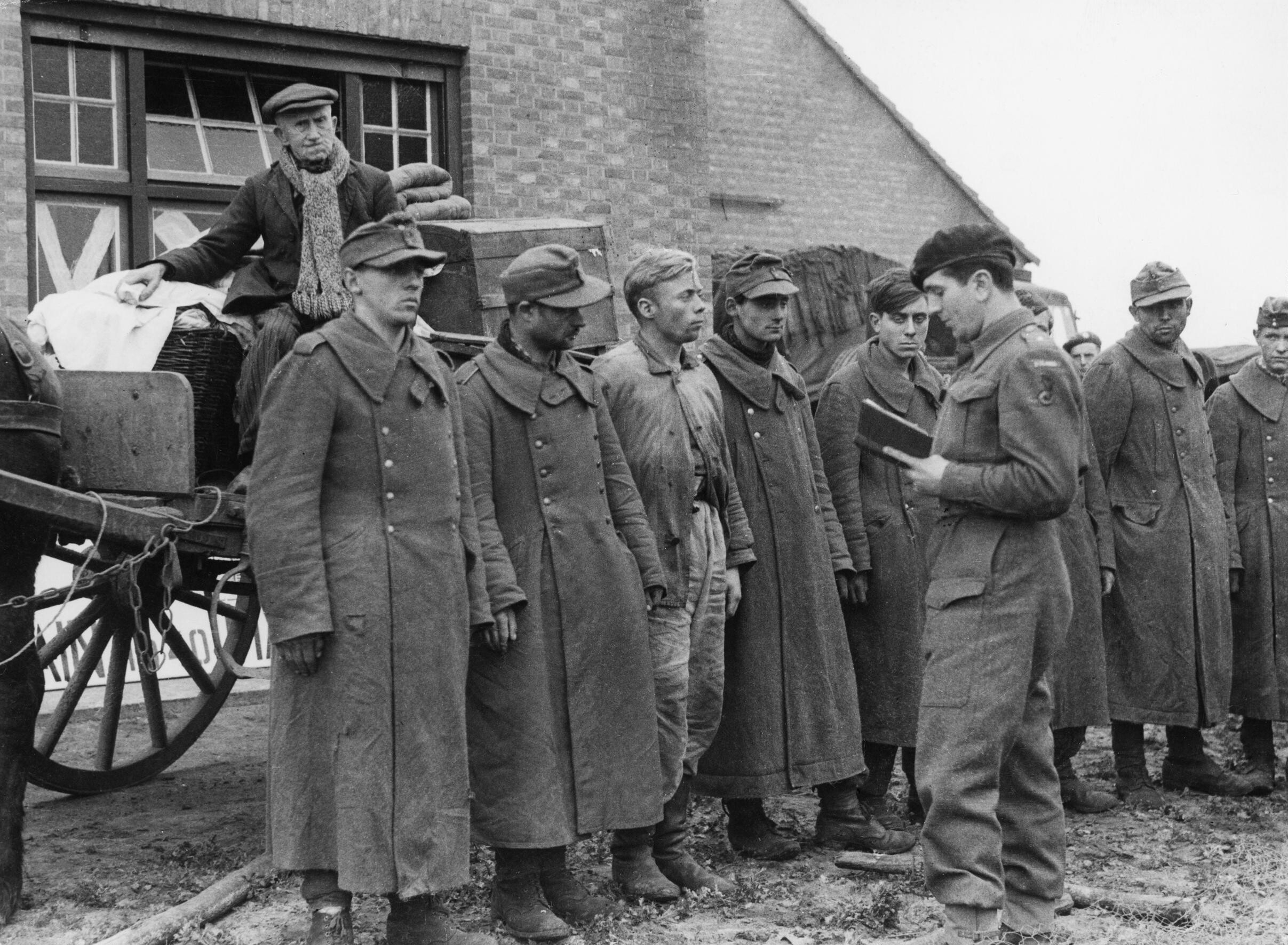
German POWs interrogated by a Lieutenant of the 1st Polish Armoured Division during Operation Pheasant, October 1944

=== Germany ===
In April 1945, the 1st Armoured entered Germany in the area of Emsland. On 6 May, the Division seized the Kriegsmarine naval base in Wilhelmshaven, where General Maczek accepted the capitulation of the fortress, naval base, East Frisian Fleet and more than 10 infantry divisions. There the Division ended the war and, joined by the Polish 1st Independent Parachute Brigade, undertook occupation duties until it was disbanded in 1947; it, together with the many Polish displaced persons in the Western occupied territories, formed a Polish enclave at Haren in Germany, which was for a while known as "Maczków". The majority of its soldiers opted not to return to Poland, which fell under Soviet occupation, preferring instead to remain in exile. Many artefacts and memorabilia belonging to Maczek and the 1st Polish Armoured Division are on display in the Polish Institute and Sikorski Museum in London.

== Organization during 1944–45 ==
1st Armoured Division — General Stanisław Maczek — comprising:

10th Armoured Cavalry Brigade (10 Brygada Kawalerii Pancernej) – Col. T. Majewski

- 1st Armoured Regiment (1 pułk pancerny) – Lt. Col. Aleksander Stefanowicz
- 2nd Armoured Regiment (2 pułk pancerny) – Lt. Col. S. Koszutski
- 24th Polish Uhlan Regiment (Armoured; 24 pułk ułanów im. Hetmana Żółkiewskiego) – Lt. Col. J. Kański
- 10th Dragoons Regiment (10 pułk dragonów zmotoryzowanych) – Lt. Col. Władysław Zgorzelski

3rd Infantry Brigade (3 brygada piechoty) – Col. Marian Wieroński

- 1st Podhale Rifles Battalion (1 batalion strzelców podhalańskich) – Lt. Col. K. Complak
- 8th Rifle Battalion (8 batalion strzelców) – Lt. Col. Aleksander Nowaczyński
- 9th Rifle Battalion (9 batalion strzelców flandryjskich) – Lt. Col. Zygmunt Szydłowski
- 1st Polish Independent HMG Squadron (samodzielna kompania ckm.) – Maj. M. Kochanowski

Divisional Artillery (Artyleria dywizyjna) – Col. B. Noel

- 1st Motorized Artillery Regiment (1 pułk artylerii motorowej) – Lt. Col. J. Krautwald de Annau
- 2nd Motorized Artillery Regiment (2 pułk artylerii motorowej) – Lt. Col. K. Maresch
- 1st Anti-Tank Regiment (formed in 1945 from smaller units) (1 pułk artylerii przeciwpancernej) – Major R. Dowbór
- 1st Anti-Aircraft Regiment (1 pułk artylerii przeciwlotniczej) – Lt. Col. O. Eminowicz, later Maj. W. Berendt

Other Units

- 10th Mounted Rifle Regiment (10 pułk strzelców konnych) (armoured reconnaissance equipped with Cromwell tanks) – Maj. J. Maciejowski
- HQ, Military Police,
- engineers (saperzy dywizyjni) – Lt. Col. J. Dorantt
- 1st Signals Battalion (1 batalion łączności) – Lt. Col. J. Grajkowski
- administration, military court, chaplaincy, reserve squadrons, medical services.

=== Numbers ===
- 885 – officers and non-commissioned officers
- 15,210 – other ranks (other enlisted soldiers)
- 381 – tanks (mostly M4A4 Shermans and Sherman Fireflys); later, the Division was the only unit in 21st Army Group to be issued the Sherman M4A1(76)w, late-model Shermans with the 76 mm gun M1 in a larger turret.
- 473 – artillery pieces (mostly motorised)
- 4,050 – motor cars, trucks, utility vehicles, artillery carriers.
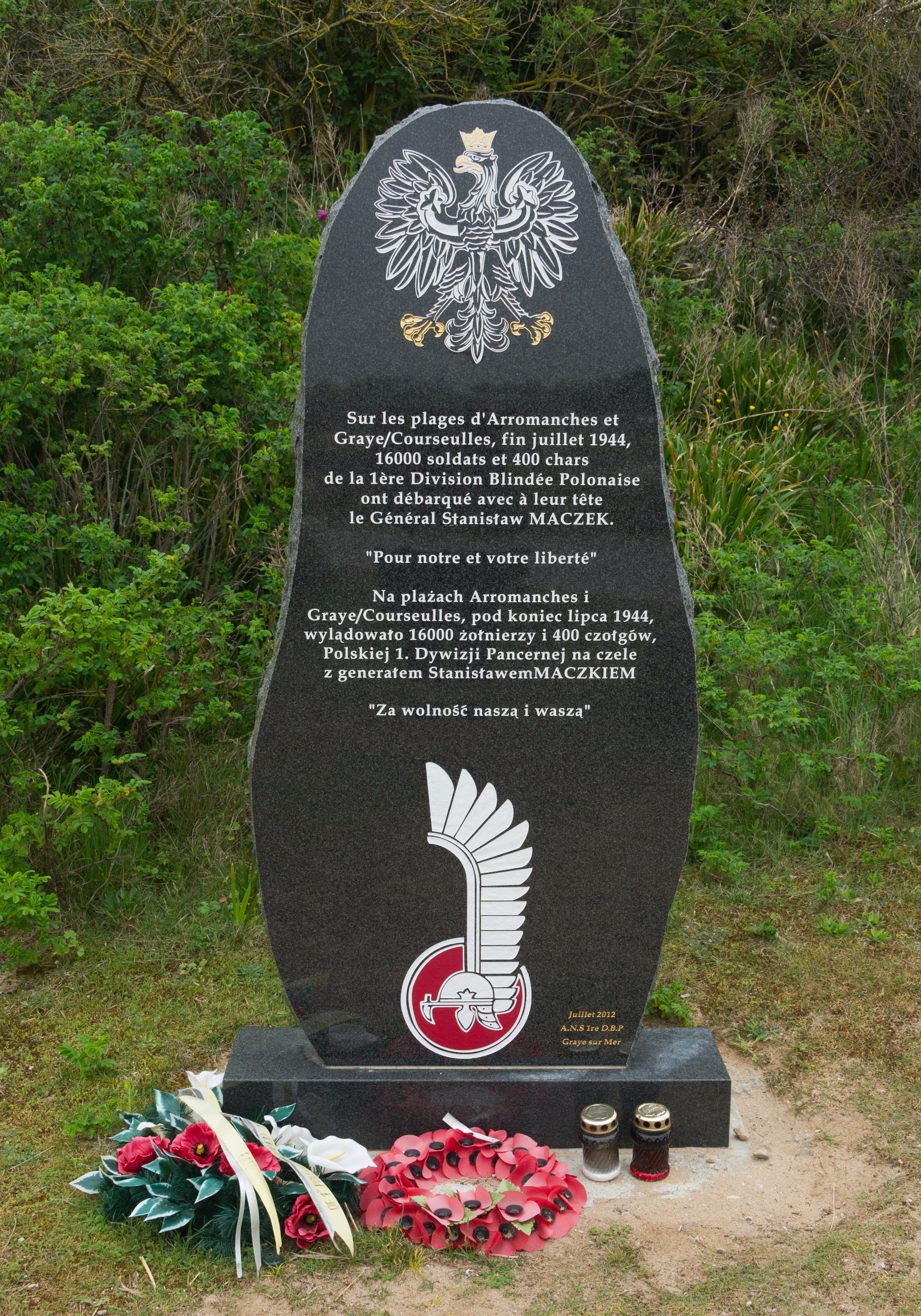
1st armoured polish division memorial

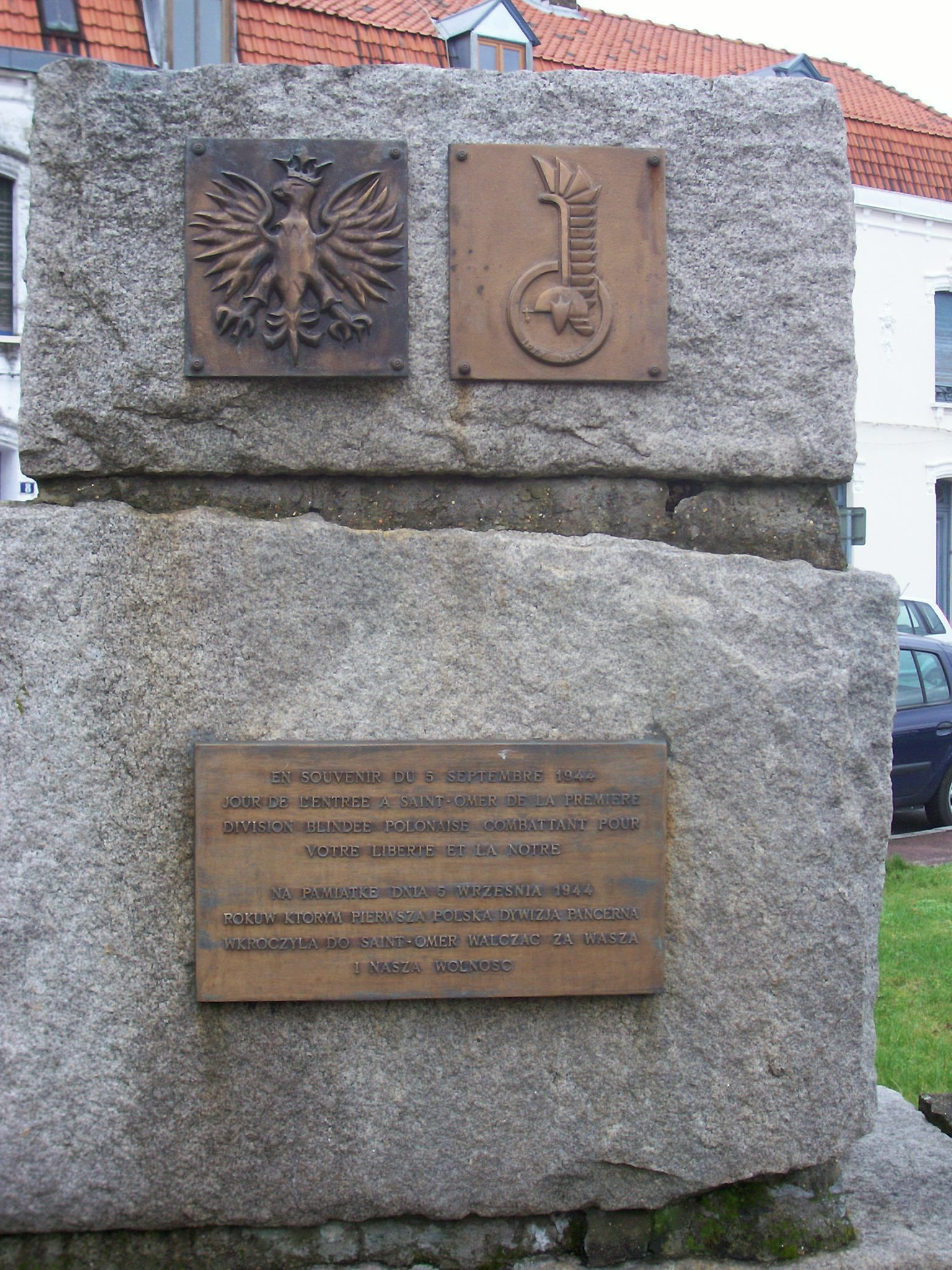
Memorial in Saint Omer to the Polish 1st Armoured Division

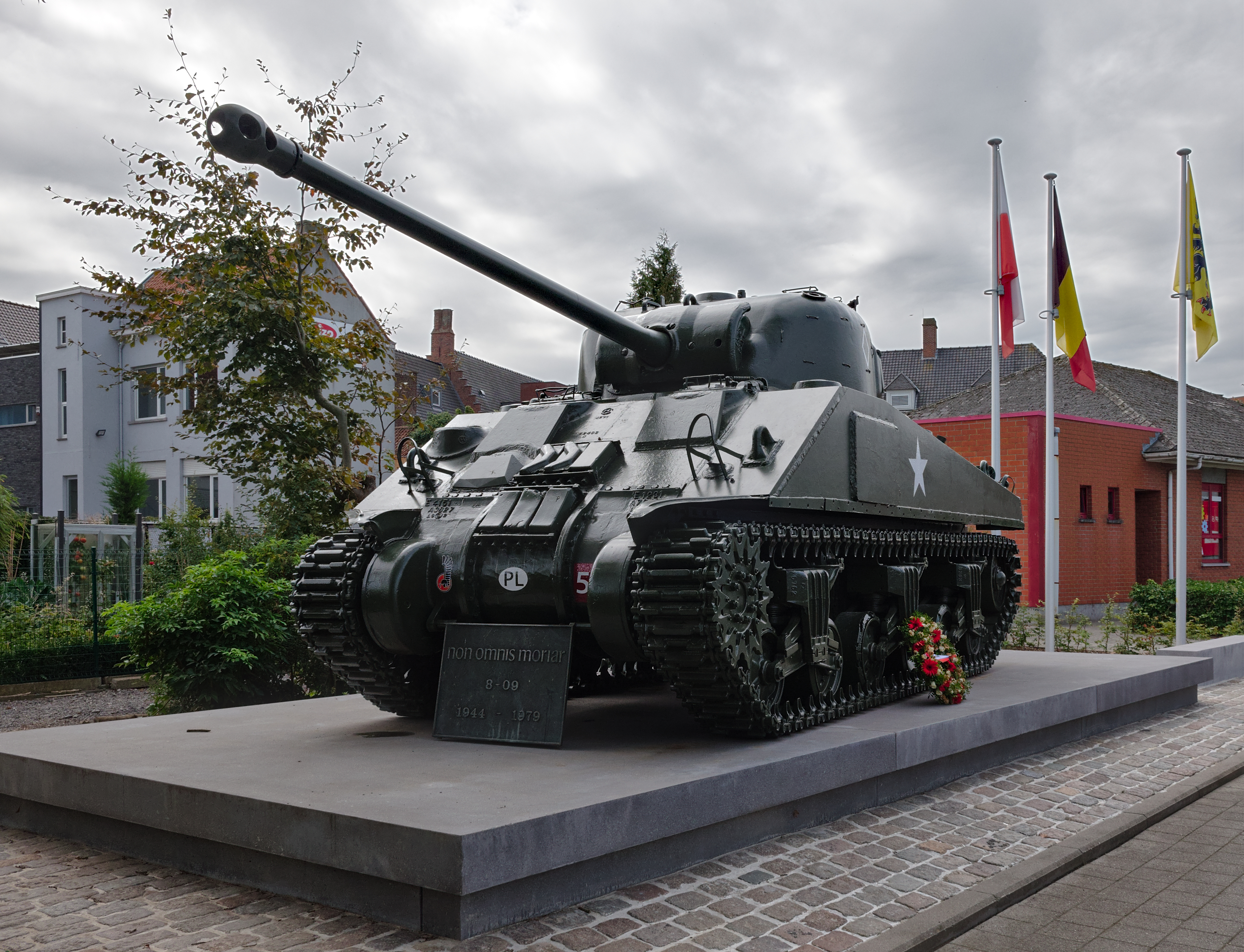
Polish Sherman Firefly monument in Tielt

== See also ==
- List of military divisions
- Western betrayal
- World War II Behind Closed Doors: Stalin, the Nazis and the West
- Polish migration to the United Kingdom
- Polish Canadians
- Great Polish Map of Scotland
