= Świętoszów =

- Village
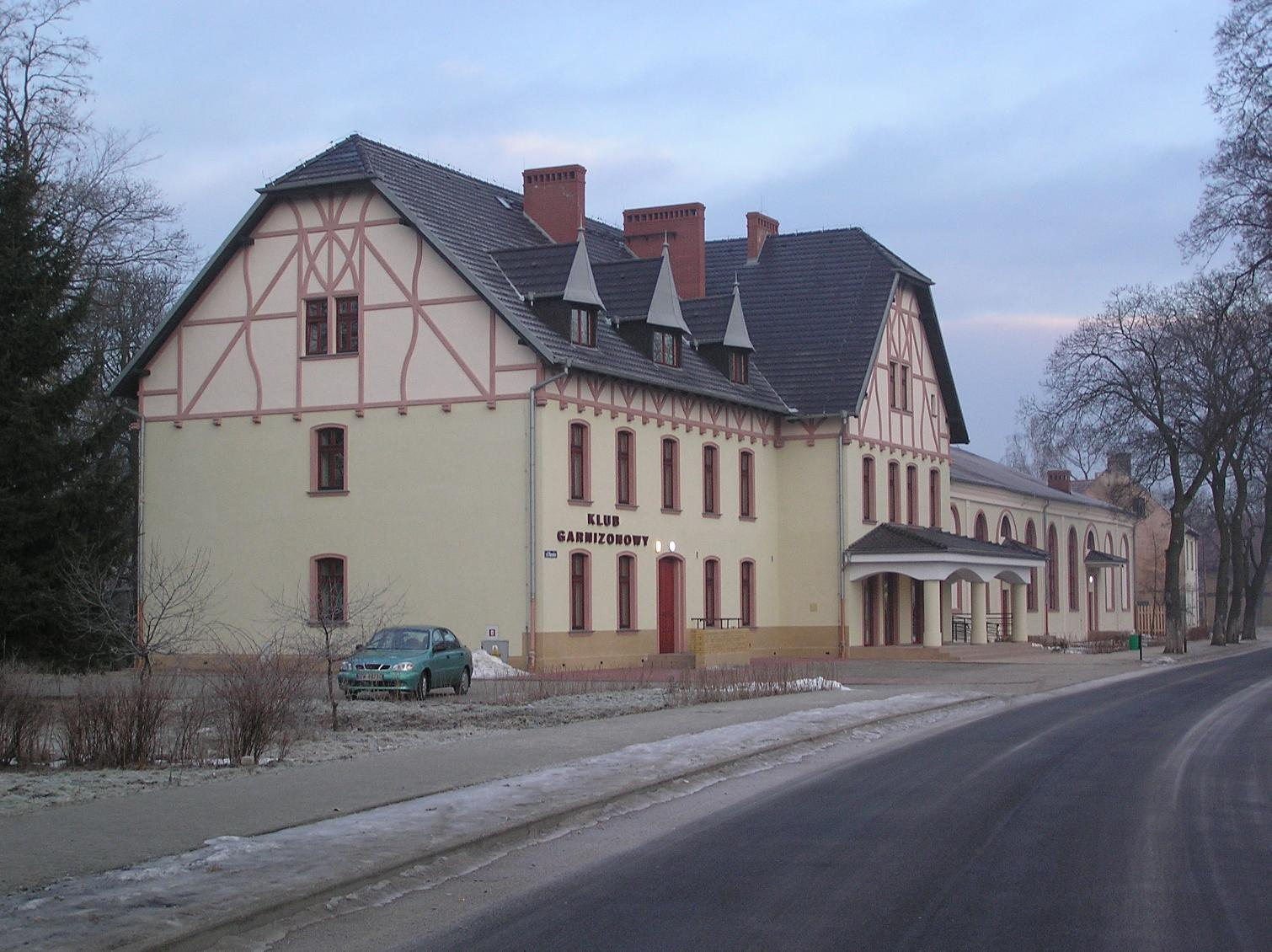
- Garrison Club in Świętoszów

- Location within Poland
- Coordinates: 51°28′N 15°24′E
- Country: Poland
- Voivodeship: Lower Silesian
- County: Bolesławiec
- Gmina: Osiecznica
- Elevation: 140 m (460 ft)
- Population (III.2011): 2,036
- Time zone: UTC+1 (CET)
  - Summer (DST): UTC+2 (CEST)

Świętoszów (Polish: [ɕfjɛnˈtɔʂuf]; German: Neuhammer am Queis) is a village in the administrative district of Gmina Osiecznica, within Bolesławiec County, Lower Silesian Voivodeship, in south-western Poland in the Lower Silesian Wilderness, on the river Kwisa.

== History ==
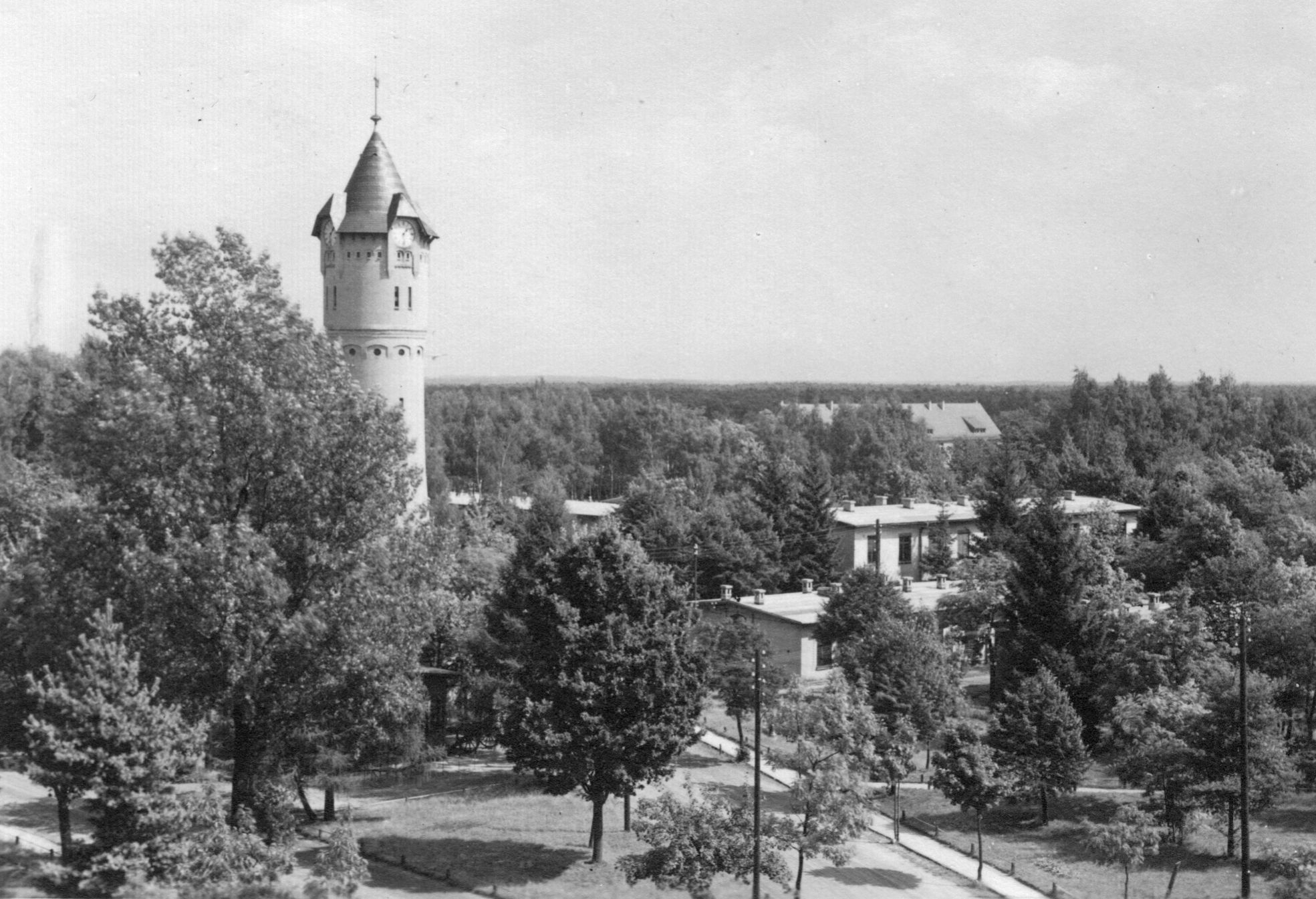
View of the village in the 1930s, when it was known as Neuhammer

In the Early Middle Ages the region was inhabited by the Bobrzanie tribe, one of the Slavic Lechitic tribes, and it became part of the emerging Polish state under its first historic ruler Mieszko I in the 10th century. Probably in the 14th century a forge was established at the site of the village, however the village itself was founded after 1550.

In the 1898 the German Army created a large training ground (de) here. In World War I it was the site of a large prisoner-of-war camp for Russian soldiers. After 1919, Polish Silesian insurgents were held in the camp. In August 1939 the ground was the scene of the 1939 Neuhammer disaster, a military air disaster when 13 Stuka dive bombers of the Luftwaffe flew into the ground in low-lying cloud. In 1941 the Bergmann Battalion and Nachtigall Battalion trained in Neuhammer. In World War II another POW camp Stalag VIII-E was built here, to house Polish and French prisoners. In 1942 they were replaced with Soviet prisoners, and the camp was placed under the administration of Stalag VIII-C near Żagań. At least 50,000 Soviet prisoners died here from disease, starvation and inhumane treatment, the last 200 of them killed as traitors after the war by the NKVD. A Red Army base until 1992, today it is the site of a Polish Army base, and since January 2017 also the NATO forces.

== Sports ==
The local football club is Twardy Świętoszów, which competes in the lower leagues, reaching the III liga (fourth tier) in 2010.

== Gallery ==
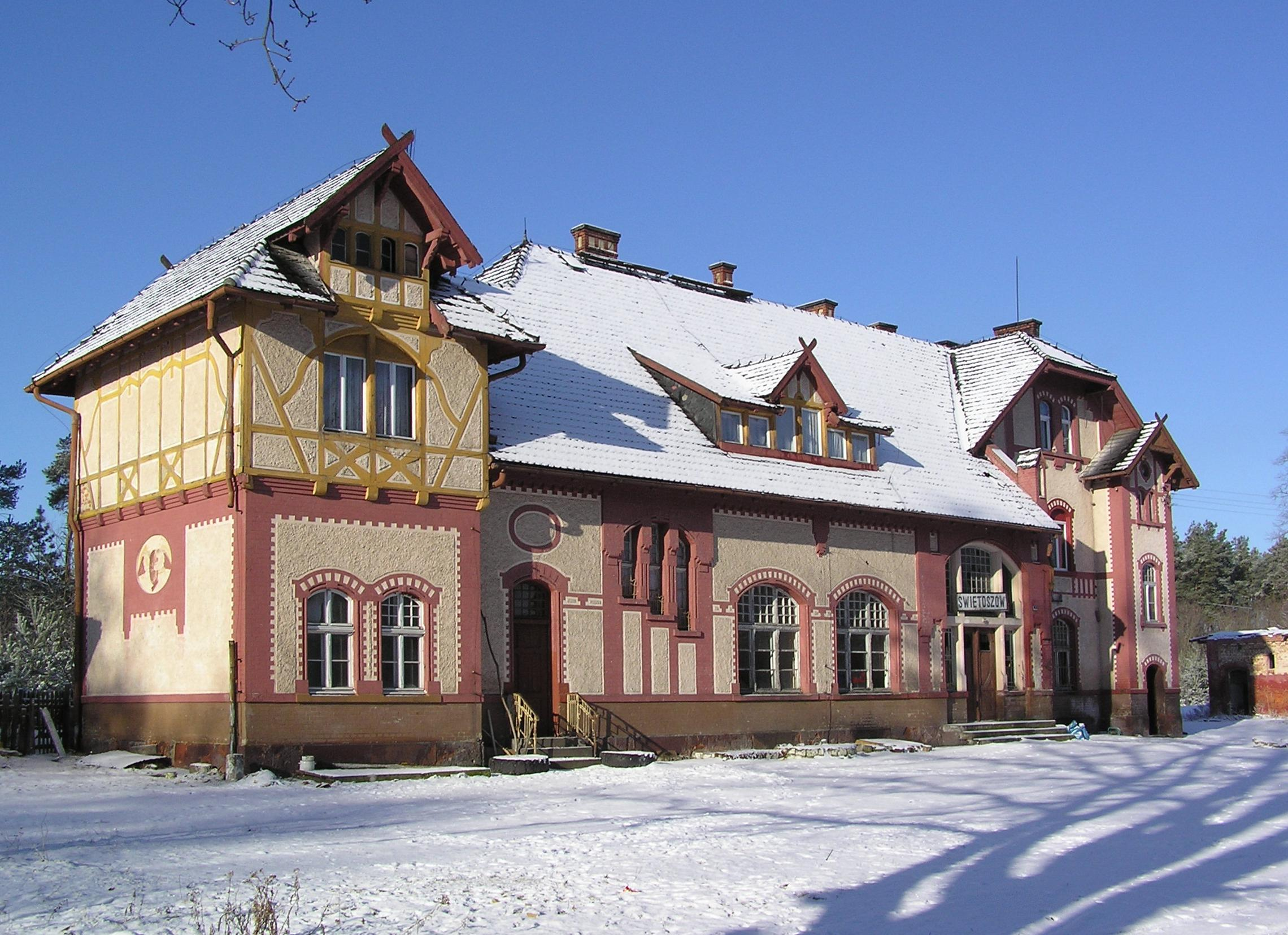
The railway station

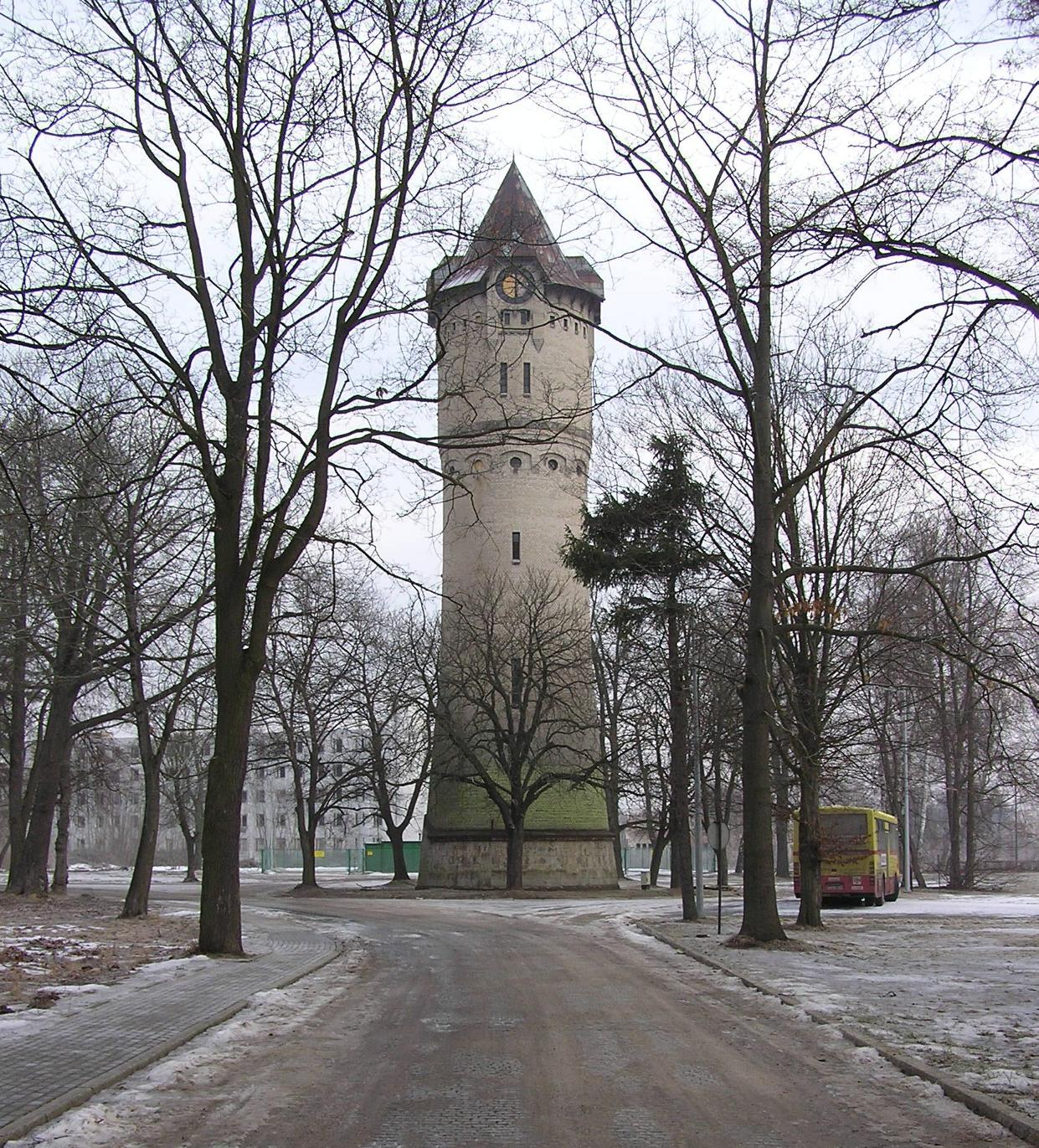
Water tower

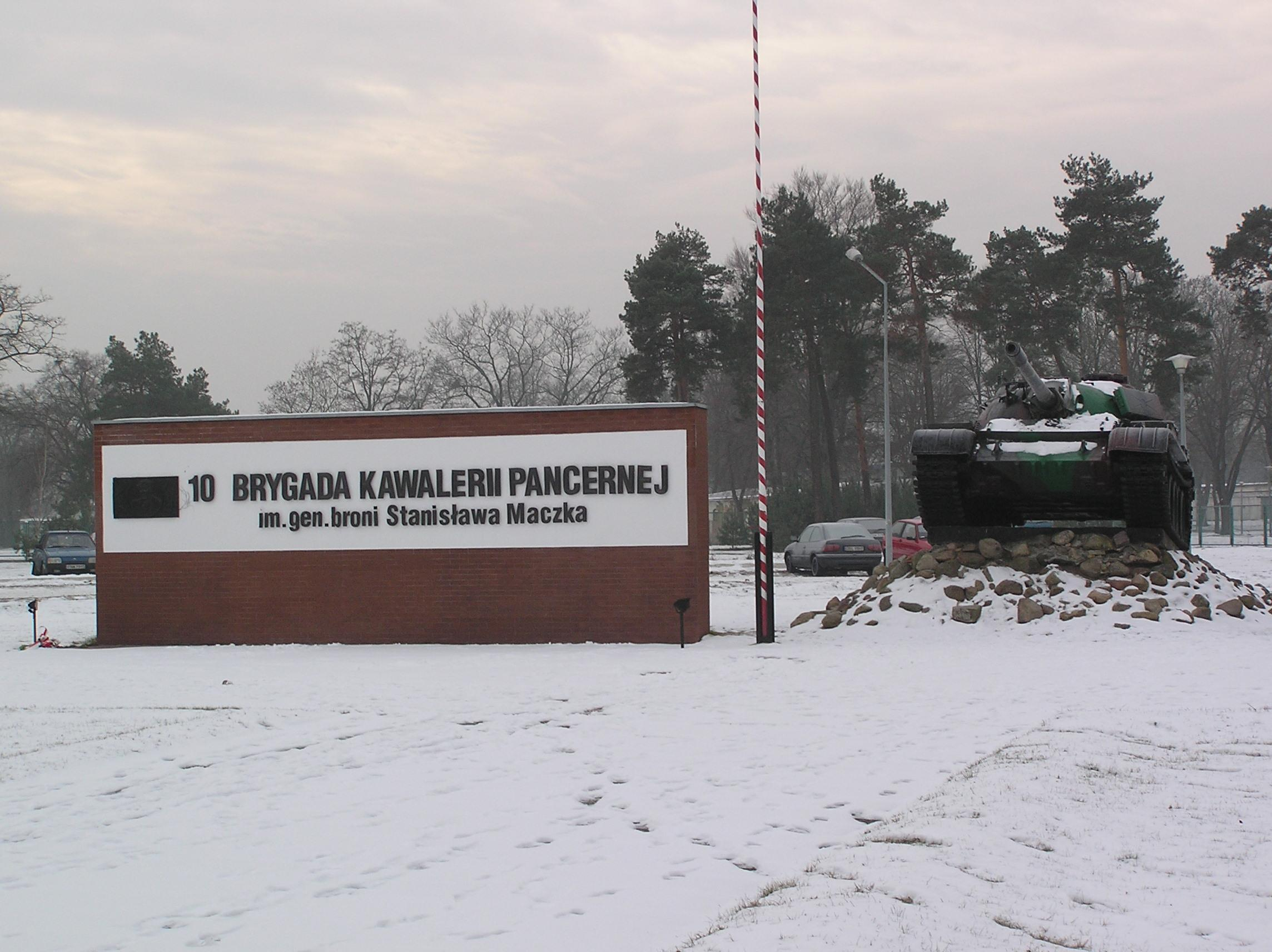
10th Armored Cavalry Brigade

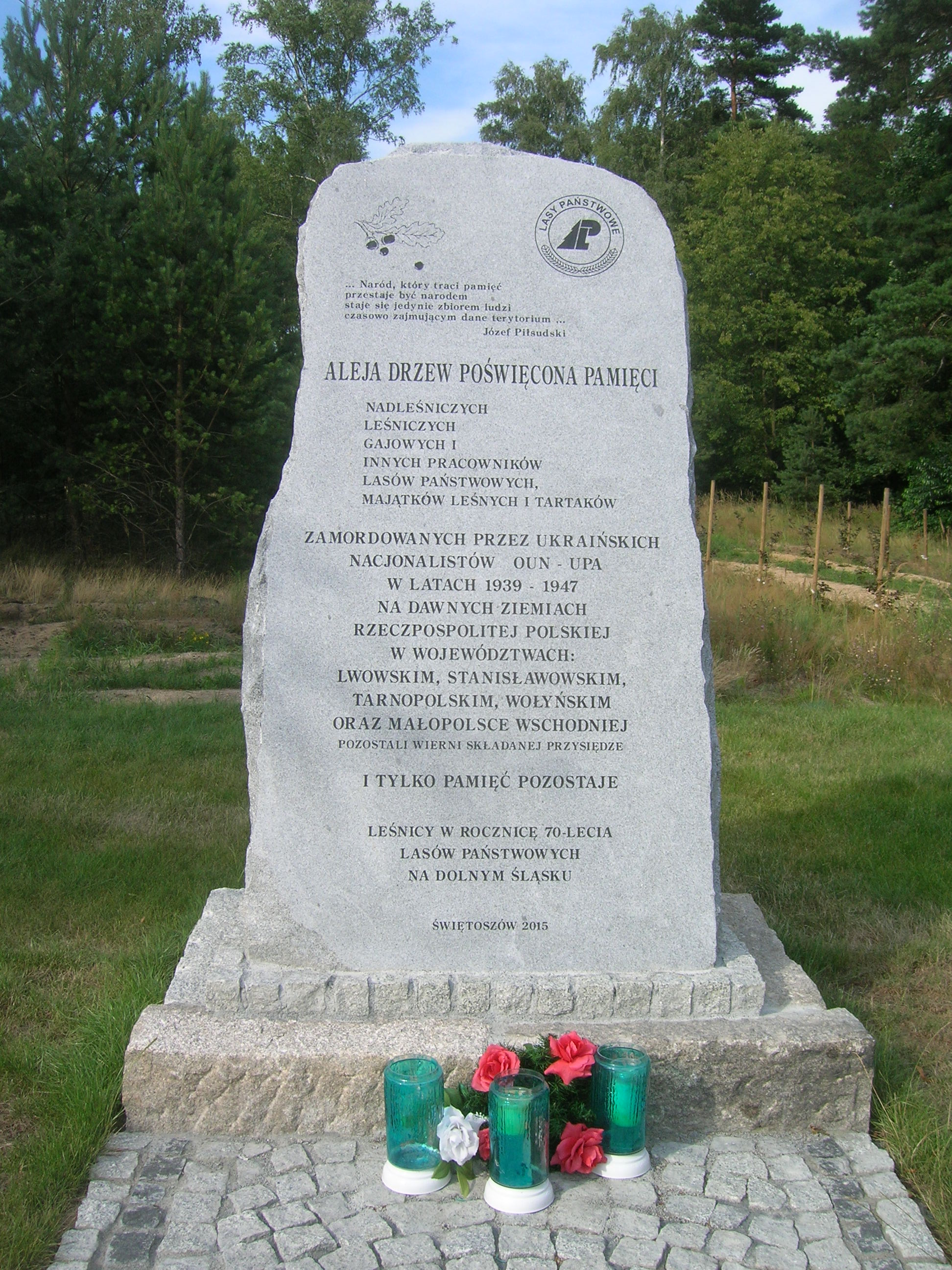
Memorial to the victims of the Massacres of Poles in Volhynia and Eastern Galicia

== See also ==
- Stalag VIII-E
