= Stalag VIII-C =

- Sagan (Żagań), Lower Silesia
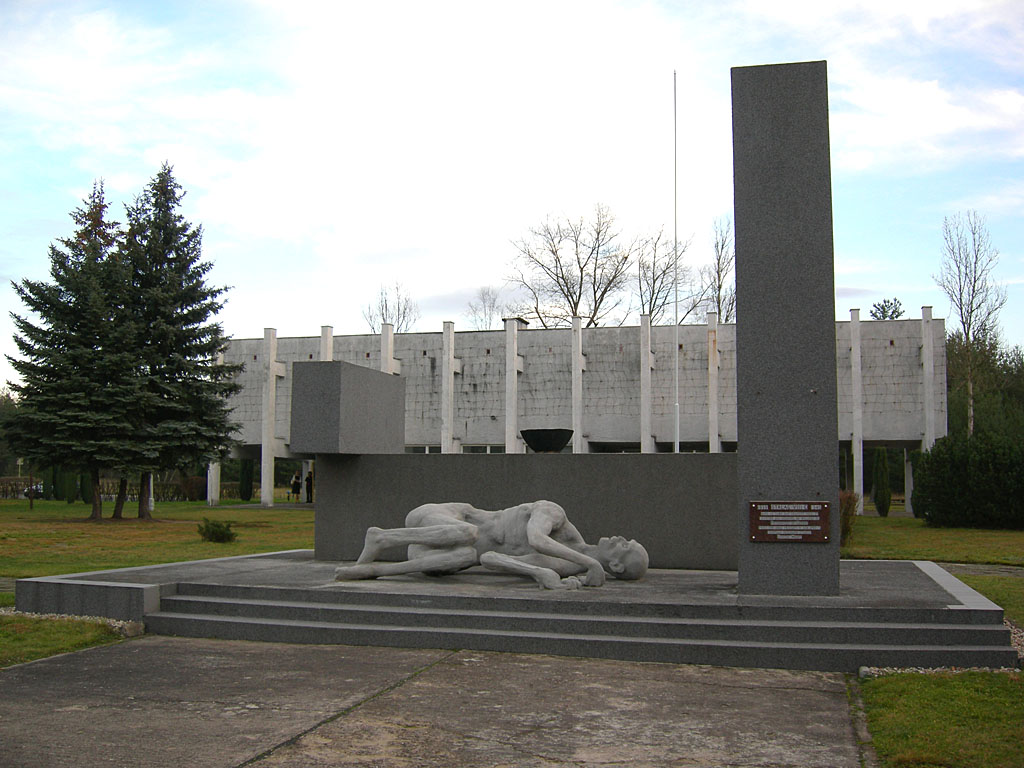
- POW Camps Museum in Żagań

Site information
- Type: Prisoner-of-war camp
- Controlled by: Nazi Germany

Location
- Sagan, Germany (pre-war borders, 1937) Stalag VIII-C (Germany)
- Coordinates: 51.5976°N 15.2944°E

Site history
- In use: 1939–1945
- Battles/wars: World War II

Garrison information
- Occupants: Polish, French, Belgian, British, Canadian, Greek, Yugoslav, Soviet, Australian, New Zealand, South African, Italian, Senegalese, Algerian, Moroccan, Slovak and other Allied POWs

Stalag VIII-C was a German World War II prisoner-of-war camp, near Sagan, Lower Silesia (now Żagań, Poland). It was adjacent to the famous Stalag Luft III, and was built at the beginning of World War II, occupying 48 ha (120 acres). It housed Allied POWs of various nationalities, incl. Polish, French, Belgian, British, Canadian, Greek, Yugoslav, Soviet, Australian, New Zealand, South African, Italian, Senegalese, Algerian, Moroccan and Slovak.

== Camp history ==
The camp was established in September 1939 to house some 5,000 Polish prisoners from the German invasion of Poland, which started World War II. As the camp was not yet completed, the POWs were used as forced laborers to complete its construction. The first captives initially slept in the open air and then in tents, the food was poor, and diseases were rampant, resulting in many deaths. Baths were organized in gasoline barrels. After the construction was completed, conditions improved slightly. In a ruthless breach of the Third Geneva Convention most of these prisoners were deprived of their POW status in June 1940 and transferred to labor camps.

French and Belgian soldiers taken prisoner during the Battle of France took their place, many of them from Algeria, Morocco and Senegal. A group of Spanish Republicans, interned in France at the end of the Spanish Civil War and later conscripted into the French Army to build fortifications, was also held in Stalag VIII-C for a short time. In 1941 more prisoners arrived from the Balkans Campaign mostly British, Canadian, Greek and Yugoslav. These were followed by Soviet prisoners from Operation Barbarossa. In late 1941 nearly 50,000 prisoners were crowded into space designed for one third that number. Conditions were appalling, starvation, epidemics and ill-treatment took a heavy toll of lives. By early 1942 the Soviet prisoners had been transferred to other camps, particularly to Stalag VIII-E.

In mid-September 1943, further numbers of British, ANZAC, and South African prisoners began to arrive by train from Italy. Most of these men had been captured during the course of the Western Desert Campaign in North Africa, and had since been detained in Mussolini's Italy. However, upon news of the Italian armistice, German forces were directed to seize administration of the Italian prison camps, and within weeks, began the process of entraining Allied POWs for transfer north, into Germany; many were sent to Stalag VIII-C. Also Italian POWs were sent to Stalag VIII-C since 1943.

In late 1944, 101 Polish insurgents of the Warsaw Uprising were imprisoned in the camp. They were held in separate barracks, isolated from the rest by additional guards and barbed wire. The last group of POWs were over 600 Slovaks from the Slovak National Uprising of 1944.

German treatment of POWs varied depending on nationality, from the best-treated Brits and Americans to the worst-treated Soviets. Until mid-1944, the nutrition of Western POWs was tolerable, as shortages were compensated by Red Cross parcels, but the situation worsened thereafter, causing malnutrition and diseases. The clothing situation for the POWs was bad, as worn-out clothing was not replenished sufficiently. Many POWs were used for forced labour in industry, agriculture and construction works in various subcamps located in the region.

== Evacuation and dissolution ==
On 8 February 1945, most of the prisoners were marched westward ahead of the Soviet offensive, leaving only 200 prisoners in the camp hospital. The German camp command destroyed all documentation and evidence of the crimes committed. During the march, the Germans executed some POWs, including the sick and those trying to get food. After a month-long march, the surviving POWs reached the Stalag IX-A camp in Ziegenhain on 7 March.

On 20 February the Red Army entered the camp. They later used the camp to house German POWs and Polish resistance members, many of whom were then deported to Siberia.

== Commemoration ==
In 1961 a monument was erected at the cemetery in remembrance of the thousands who died and are buried here. In 1971 the "Martyrdom Museum of Allied Prisoners of War" was established on the site of the camp to house mementos and records of both Stalag VIII-C and Stalag Luft III.

British prisoners-of-war who died in the camp were buried at a cemetery of the Commonwealth War Graves Commission in Poznań.

== See also ==
- List of prisoner-of-war camps in Germany
