= 1st Armoured Regiment (Poland) =

Armoured regiment during World War II

- 1 Pułk Pancerny
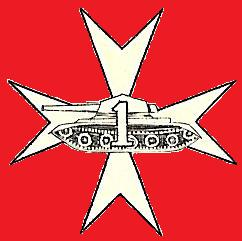
- Badge of the 1st Polish Armoured Regiment
- Active: 1939 – June 1947
- Country: Poland
- Branch: 1st Armoured Division
- Role: Armoured warfare
- Anniversaries: 19 August
- Engagements: World War II: Battle of France; Operation Overlord; Falaise pocket; Hill 262; Western Allied invasion of Germany

The 1st Armoured Regiment (Polish: 1 Pułk Pancerny) was an armoured regiment of the Polish Armed Forces in the West during World War II, part of the 1st Armoured Division.

== France 1939 ==
The 1st Polish Armoured Regiment of the 1st Polish Armoured Division has its origins in France. After the Soviet Army invaded from the East, with the German Army invading from the West, the Polish government went into exile and the Polish Army in units, and as individuals, made their way to France to regroup. Some Polish soldiers came from Poland through enemy territory. Others took a roundabout route through neighbouring countries by any means available, some after being interned for a period of time. They all made their way to the camp at Coëtquidan in Brittany. This camp became the centre of the Polish Army in exile. Additional Poles came from the large émigré community in France and Belgium to enlist.

On 20 November 1939, the Armoured Group was formed under the command of Major L. Furs-Żyrkiewicz. It was made up mostly of soldiers from the former armoured units of Poland. The 1st Tank Battalion was formed from these former armoured units on 2 December 1939 and left the camp at Coëtquidan for the village of Campenéac. On this day, it became an independent unit. Its name would change (65th Tank Battalion, 1st Tank Battalion, 1st Armoured Regiment), but it could trace its roots to this date as its birth.

Living conditions at both camps were poor. The soldiers' morale was low because of the harsh winter conditions, lack of equipment, and poor living quarters. During February 1940, the Battalion left Campenéac for St. Cécile-les-Vignes. Here the 10th Motorized Cavalry Brigade was formed from all the armoured units. The Battalion fell under the Brigade in the chain of command. Soon afterwards, the first Renault FT tanks arrived, and training with these vintage and obsolete World War I tanks began.

The German offensive on 10 May caused the Battalion to accelerate its preparations and training for battle. On 27 May 1940, under the command of Major Stanisław Gliński, it moved to Versailles, where it received modern tanks and equipment. Also on this day, the 1st Company was transferred to airfield protection duties and the Finnish Company took its place. The Battalion had only ten days to learn how to operate the new Renault R35 and R39 tanks.

On 8 June 1940, the Battalion was deployed to Champagne, where the 10th Motorized Cavalry Brigade, under the command of General Maczek, was located. The situation at the front, as a result of the German offensive on 10 June, was hopeless. The Germans had infiltrated behind the French lines. Champagne and Burgundy were being surrounded from the west. The units in this pocket were being systematically destroyed from the air. The Battalion, from the day it arrived in Champagne on 12 June 1940, sustained heavy losses, due to German air attacks. Enemy aircraft broke the Battalion's first attack attempt. In the chaos that ensued, the Battalion retreated to the south while under constant assault from the air.

Lt-Col. Tadeusz Majewski took command of the Battalion on 15 June 1940. The Battalion was made the Brigade's spearhead for the breakout from the pocket created by the enemy. The attack began on the night of 16 June 1940 with the 4th Motorized Division in the town of Montbard in Burgundy. As a result of heavy losses inflicted during the night, the enemy withdrew from Montbard. This victory was short-lived, however, for the Battalion was out of ammunition and fuel. The next day, orders were issued for the crews to destroy their tanks, to prevent them falling into enemy hands, and disband The men were ordered to make their way south as best they could. The temporary disbandment of the Battalion ended its part in the French campaign.

The fates of these men were varied. The French people often risked their lives to help. Some made it across the German lines and reached French ports, in time to leave on the last ships leaving for England. Some were taken prisoner. Some were interned in the Spanish concentration camp of Miranda del Ebro after crossing the Spanish border. Others made it to North Africa, where they were interned and forced to work on the construction of the Trans-Sahara Railroad. The majority, however, after overcoming many obstacles (lack of money, lack of papers, lack of transportation etc.), in some cases taking years (some made their way through Russia to Japan to the U.S./Canada/South America to England; literally travelling around the world), made it back to their units regrouping in Britain.

== Britain 1940 ==
The arrival in Great Britain was in stark contrast to their previous arrival in France from Poland. They were welcomed into people's homes till permanent quarters were arranged, which were an improvement over those in France. The living conditions alone were enough to boost morale. This would aid them during the 4 years it would take to prepare and train for the upcoming battles on the continent.

The Battalion reported to Crawford in Lanarkshire. The camp was located in the Clyde River valley in Scotland. During its 4 months there, the Battalion was reorganized and brought to full strength by the return of 1st Company, but it still lacked equipment. Maj. Henryk Świetlicki took command in August 1940.

The start of the Battle of Britain highlighted the threat of invasion of the British Isles. The Battalion was now on a high state of alert. It patrolled the area and established guard posts in the surrounding hills. On 22 October 1940, the Battalion was moved to Blairgowrie in Perthshire, where it was stationed for 17 months. A close bond formed between the soldiers and the local population. Blairgowrie became the adopted home of the Battalion. Its men would never forget the kindness and hospitality of the people. Infantry training took place during the winter of 1940 and preparations made for the anticipated invasion. Tanks finally arrived in the spring of 1941. The first to arrive were Valentines. A few months later, they received Mark I's. Their arrival boosted morale. In the summer of 1941, the Battalion's duties included: protecting nearby airfields; guarding Broughty Ferry on the Scottish East Coast; and building anti-invasion obstacles around Dundee. In addition to their military duties, the Battalion assisted the local population with the harvesting of wheat and potatoes.

During the autumn of 1941, the Battalion received the new 40-ton Churchill tanks. The Churchill was later followed by three other tank models. As a result, the Poles were experienced in various types of armoured vehicles (not just tanks).

On 27 September 1941 the Battalion was renamed the 65th Tank Battalion. During December 1941, volunteers arriving from the United States and South America were inducted into the Battalion. In early April 1942, the Battalion left Blairgowrie for Camp Langton near Duns in Berwickshire. The local population, here again, welcomed the soldiers of the Battalion into their homes. In both Blairgowrie and Duns, the Battalion left commemorative plaques, thanking the local population for their hospitality. Shortly after arriving at Camp Langton, the Battalion's Churchills were replaced by Covenanters. On 25 March 1942, General Maczek was appointed Division Commander. The 10th Armoured Cavalry Brigade and 16th Armoured Brigade formed the core of the division. Maj Bolesław Sokołowski assumed command of the Battalion in June 1942. On 12 August 1942, 16th Tank Brigade was renamed 16th Armoured Brigade. As a result, the 65th Tank Battalion on 13 August 1942, as a result of the formation of the 1st Polish Armoured Division, the Battalion was renamed the 1st Armoured Regiment. In the autumn of 1942, Crusader tanks arrived. Now training was mainly focused on the Covenanter tanks and the Crusaders. During 1943, more Polish soldiers arrived from the Middle East. These men, making their way from Russian internment camps under General Anders, helped to make up the shortfall in manpower in the division. From May till the end of September 1943, the Regiment participated in Divisional manoeuvers in south-east England near Bury St. Edmunds in Suffolk. Afterwards, the regiment returned to Camp Langton. On 21 September 1943, the 16th Armoured Headquarters was absorbed into the 10th Armoured Cavalry Brigade. On 12 October 1943, the combined Brigade was renamed the 10th Armoured Cavalry Brigade. The 1st Armoured Regiment was now under the 10th Armoured Cavalry Brigade. Maj Aleksander Stefanowicz assumed command of the Regiment in November 1943. At this time, the Regiment had begun to receive its final allocation of equipment, which included Sherman and Stuart tanks. The winter of 1943 was spent training on these new tanks. This included practice on the gunnery range at Kirkcudbright. In May 1944, the Regiment left Duns for Bridlington in Yorkshire, where it remained for 2 months. In mid July 1944, it moved to Aldershot, south west of London. This was the Regiment's last staging area for the continent. Having made the final preparations and received its final equipment, the Regiment left for the marshalling area in Portsmouth for embarkation.

== France 1944 ==
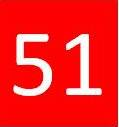
Unit Flash of the 1st Polish Armoured Regiment located on the left rear and right front of its vehicles.

The Regiment disembarked at the artificial Mulberry Harbor near Arromanches in Normandy. On 1 August 1944, the Regiment assembled in France.

The Regiment's first battle on the continent occurred on 8 August 1944 south east of Caen. As part of the 1st Polish Armoured Division, it was ordered to attack the heavily defended German lines at Falaise.

The regiment distinguished itself in the battle for Renemesnil on 9 August 1944. Around 1200hrs, it received heavy artillery and mortar fire in the neighbourhood of the church. Between 1220 and 1255hrs, the Regiment reached the western outskirts of Cauvicourt. In area 84 (S Renemesnil), Tiger tanks appeared with very effective supporting artillery fire. Attacking, the Regiment took Hill 84 by about 1600hrs, but was stopped on the south slope by very fierce anti-tank defences. At 1300hrs, the Commanding Officer of the Regiment decided to attack Hill 111 (along the axis 84 Chein Hausse). Second Squadron of the Regiment captured the hill. The enemy had put up a very heavy fire of mortars, artillery and anti-tank guns. The 1st Armoured Regiment had broken the German defences by the Laison River and reached Hill 111. In this operation, the Regiment suffered heavy losses: 3 officers killed (including the 2 in command) and 10 other ranks; 4 officers wounded and 11 other ranks; 1 officer missing and 7 other ranks. During the action on Hill 111, the 1st Armoured Regiment freed from the Germans about 100 Canadian soldiers who had been without food and ammunition for 2 days. Captured German prisoners confessed that the attack had demoralized the German infantry garrison.

On 15 August, the Regiment took part in the crossing of the Dives River near Jort. On 16 August 1944, 3rd Rifle Brigade less 8th Rifle Battalion held the bridgeheads in Jort (1st Mountain Rifle Battalion) and Morieres (9th Rifle Battalion) reinforced by the 1st Armoured Regiment, which reconnoitered in the direction of the woods of Courcy.

On 18 August 1944, 10th Armoured Cavalry Brigade Command ordered the 1st Armoured Regiment to attack in the direction of Bourdon to enable the resupply of Lt-Col. Koszutski's group. This did not occur due to Allied aircraft mistakenly bombing them. On 19 August 1944 by 1539hrs, the 1st Armoured Regiment reported that with all their forces, they had taken the area of Coudehard and they were heavily engaged with Panther tanks and heavy enemy artillery fire. By nightfall, the 1st Armoured Regiment, 1st Mountain Rifle Battalion, and one anti-tank battery occupied both Hill 262 and Hill 252 (Maczuga). The 1st Polish Armoured Division had borne the whole burden of battle this day against a superior enemy force consisting of units of the 1st and 2nd SS Corps.

The enemy attacked the 1st and 2nd Armoured Regiments the entire day of 20 August 1944 from all sides. The Germans attacked from the West, where they were trapped in the gap, and from the East where the 21st Panzer Division tried to open a path for their comrades trapped in the gap. The battle closed to a distance of 50 meters.

That night, Lt-Col. Stefanowicz, doubtful of his men's chances of survival due to lack of food and ammunition, told his men: "Gentlemen. Everything is lost. I do not believe the Canadians will manage to help us. We have only 110 men left, with 50 rounds per gun and 5 rounds per tank... Fight to the end! To surrender to the SS is senseless, you know it well. Gentlemen! Good luck – tonight, we will die for Poland and civilization. We will fight to the last platoon, to the last tank, then to the last man." On 21 August 1944, a platoon of the Regiment's 3rd Squadron reconnoitred the German positions below the Zameczek ( a hunting lodge on the ridge of Hill 262's northern slope).

By 1045 hrs, the Canadians had linked up with the 2nd Armoured Regiment. In the afternoon, a Canadian Brigade arrived in the area of Hill 262 MACZUGA. They brought supplies for the armoured regiments.

The final German effort was launched at around 1100hrs by SS remnants that had infiltrated through the wooded hills to the rear of the 1st Armoured Regiment's dressing station. This "suicidal" assault was defeated at point-blank range by the 9th Infantry Battalion, with the 1st Armoured Regiment's tanks using their anti-aircraft machine guns in support. The machine gun's tracer set fire to the grass amongst the German troops, killing the wounded men on the slope. As the final infantry assaults melted away, the German artillery and mortar fire targeting the hill finally subsided as well.

On 22 August 1944, the disposition of the 10th Armoured Cavalry Brigade consisted of: 1st Armoured Regiment, 24th Lancers, 1st Mountain Rifle Battalion, 10th Dragoons and one Anti-Tank Battery. Their area of responsibility consisted of Mount Ormel, Hill 262, and Chambois. Their task was: to defend the area to the East and the North; to link up and maintain contact with the 4th Canadian Armoured Division in St Lambert Sur Dives and to link up and maintain contact with the American troops South of Frenes. In the evening, General Crear of the Canadian Army Command commended the 1st Armoured Division for their actions.

The period between 19 and 21 August 1944 saw a life and death struggle for the Germans trapped in the Falaise Pocket and for the Regiment. It had to fend off the desperate attacks of infantry and tanks of the elite German armoured divisions of the 1st SS and the 12th SS. The hllform known as 'the Mace' was a very bloody scene of carnage and destruction. The roads leading to it were covered with dead German soldiers; dead horses; and hundreds of destroyed vehicles, tanks, and guns. Here the Poles had their revenge on the Germans for the invasion and destruction of their homeland. The seizure and defence of the Mace denied the Germans the north-eastern routes of retreat. The battle of the Mace was a total defeat for the Germans.

The German forces in the Falaise Pocket were destroyed. Field Marshal Montgomery later described the Mace as the cork in the bottle that was the Falaise Pocket. The American, British and Canadian forces were the bottle and the Polish forces were the cork that kept the Germans from escaping. The 2 weeks, from 16 to 23 August 1944 were highly successful, but at a high cost in men and equipment. For this reason, 19 August, the day the Regiment seized the Mace in the region of Coudehart near Chambois, became the Regimental Day afterwards.

Due to its heavy losses, the Regiment was relieved on 23 August 1944 to recover. It was able to reconstitute its manpower from the POWs it had captured during the battle of the Mace. Among the POWs were Poles who had been conscripted to serve in the German Army. They quickly volunteered to join in the defeat of the Axis and the liberation of Poland. This pattern was followed throughout the war. This was the only reserve available to the entire 1st Armoured Division. If not for these conscripted soldiers, the 1st Armoured Division would have been broken up and its men used as replacements in other British units.

After a few days, the pursuit of the German Army continued. During the Regiment's pursuit, it engaged the rear-guard of the fleeing German Army. It fought for the crossing of the Somme River below Abbeville.

The 1st Armoured Regiment was part of the vanguard for this action. At 1200hrs on 1 September 1944, the vanguard moved out under the command of Major Zgorzelski, 10th Dragoons, which also consisted of 10th Dragoons minus one squadron, one Battery Artillery Support, and one Battery Anti-Tank Support. At 1835hrs due to enemy resistance, supported by artillery, the vanguard engaged the enemy. At 1930hrs, the vanguard crossed the bridge at Blangy.

== Belgium 1944 ==
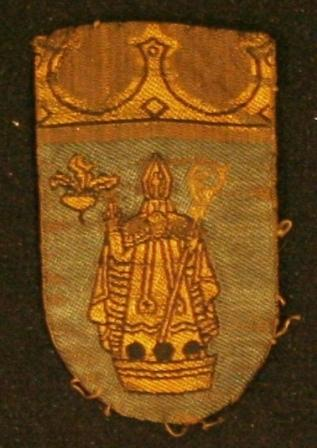
The town of St. Nicolas adopted the men of the 1st Polish Armoured Regiment and gave them the right to wear the coat of arms on the right sleeve of their uniforms.

It then fought its way to the Neuf Fosse Canal, where it entered Belgium on 6 September 1944.

At 2200hrs, 10th Armoured Cavalry Brigade, 1st and 2nd Armoured Regiments, 10th Dragoons, 10th Mounted Rifles, 10th Coy Engineers, two batteries Anti Tank Support moved to a protected night bivouac 3 kilometers northeast of Ypres.

On this day, 1st Armoured Regiment bypassed Ypres, thus cutting off the retreat of the Germans, who were still occupying the town. Attacking with the entire brigade, Ypres was captured. The following 2 days were spent fighting for Roullers (now Roeselare). After bypassing Thielt (the town Tielt), the Regiment engaged the enemy in the Ruysselede (Ruiselede) area on September 8, 1944.

It had advanced 524 km in 12 days. In the process, it had destroyed many German columns and captured large numbers of prisoners. The following week, it fought in the area of St Nicolas. It entered the town on 12 September 1944. It captured Stekene. On 19 September 1944, patrols of the 1st Armoured Regiment detached in the direction of Axelsche – Sabuek encountered enemy forces along the Spun – Kreek Canal.

== Holland 1944 ==
It entered Holland to assist in capturing Axel and reached the mouth of the Scalde River. At this point, the Regiment was ordered to St Gilles, Belgium to recover. They were welcomed by the local population. After a few days rest in nearby St Nicolas, Belgium, they were ready to resume their duties. On 28 September 1944, east of Antwerp, the Regiment engaged the enemy along with units of the 3rd Infantry Brigade. The country-side was heavily wooded and mined. The Germans defense consisted of many anti-tank guns and artillery. The odds were in the enemy's favor. They captured Baarle-Nassau and Alphen after a battle that lasted for 5 days.

On 4 October 1944 at 1415hrs, 9th Rifle Brigade plus one Anti-Tank Battery and one squadron from the 1st Armoured Regiment captured the western outskirts of the forest near Baarle-Nassau.

With the capture of Alphen, a temporary stalemate followed. For the next 3, weeks the Regiment consolidated its position. On 27 October 1944, the Regiment executed its orders for the capture of Breda. After 8 days of battle, Breda was taken. The Regiment was able to recover there for a few days afterwards. It was then ordered to capture Made, which it did. The final stage of the offensive was reaching the Maas River.

At this point, from 9 November 1944 to 7 April 1945, the Regiment maintained a defensive position along the river. During this time, the Regiment stayed in Wagenberg, Oosterhout, and Udenhout respectively. In January–February 1945, the Regiment took up positions on the peninsula of St Philipsland and the island of Tholen, where there was heavy enemy activity. In late February 1945, the Regiment returned to the district of Dongen-Oosterhout, where the tanks were the advance guard. During this time, the Regiment was frequently on the move and engaged in minor skirmishes, but not without losses. A constant threat 24 hours a day, throughout this time, were the thousands of V-1, buzz bombs. They constantly flew by overhead and sometimes exploded nearby.

== Germany 1945 ==
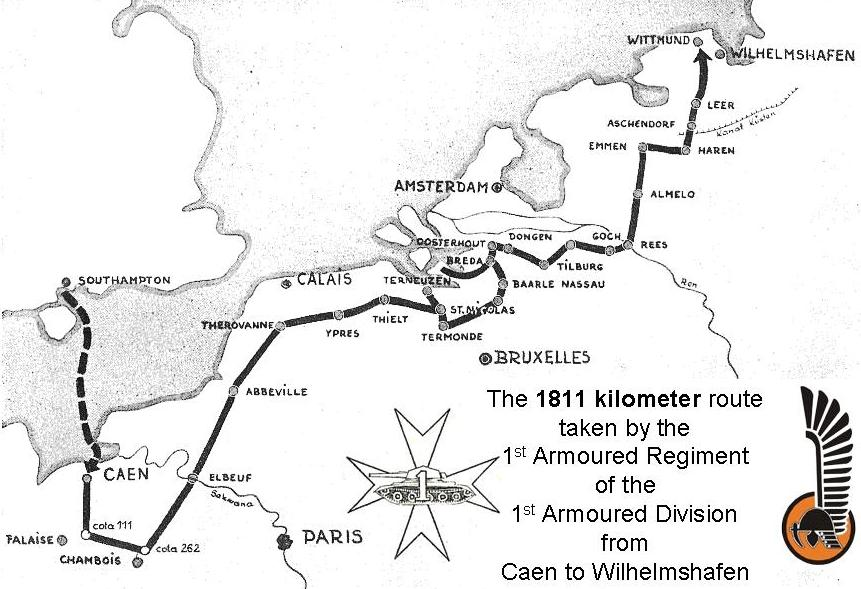
The 1811 kilometer route taken by the 1st Armoured Regiment from landing in Normandy to the end of the war in Germany.

The Regiment, on 7 April 1945, realized one of its goals. It left Dongen and after covering 240 km in 34 hours, crossed the Rhine River at Rees. On 14 April 1945, the Regiment relieved the Canadians at the heavily defended Küsten Canal. After the canal was bridged by other units of the division, the Regiment launched an attack on Aschendorf. It was captured on 20 April 1945, after overcoming the many obstacles imposed by the terrain (the tanks had to keep to the roads along the dikes as the surrounding terrain was unsuitable for armor) and the enemy's anti-tank guns.

For the following 2 days, the Regiment battled the enemy north of Papenburg and seized the communication center of Ihrhove-Ihren. A week later, it crossed the Leda River to open the road for the 3rd Infantry Brigade. It passed Leer, Loga, Filsum, Hesel, and Moorburg. After overcoming numerous obstacles and demolished roads and bridges, it captured the village of Halsbek. Here at 0800 hours on 5 May 1945, a cease fire was ordered. Germany had surrendered. The next morning, the Regiment was ordered north to Clevern. It passed by many German columns, which were proceeding to assembly areas as ordered by the Allies.

== Occupation 1945 ==
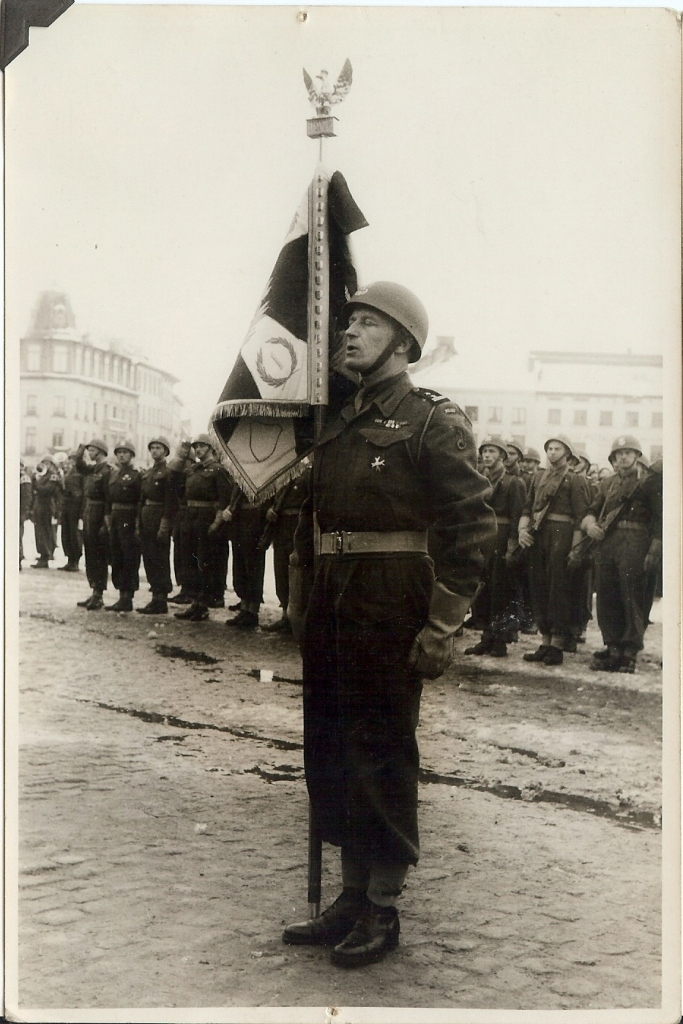
LtCol Aleksander Stefanowicz, Commander of the 1st Polish Armoured Regiment, after receiving the Regimental Colours at St Nicolas, Belgium on 3 March 1946.

The left side of the Regimental Colours of the 1st Polish Armoured Regiment in World War II.

On 8 May 1945, the Regiment was ordered to Wittmund, 25 km from Wilhelmshaven. Here the Regiment began its occupation duties. The Regiment had covered 1811 km from the time it had landed on the continent. It celebrated its first Regimental Day on 19 August 1945.

On 3 March 1946, St Nicolas presented the regiment with its colors. With the adoption of the Regiment by the town of St Nicolas, the soldiers of the Regiment were given the right to wear the town's coat of arms on their uniforms.

The victory was bittersweet for the Polish soldiers. They had defeated the Germans, who had started the war by invading Poland, but they had failed to liberate Poland. This was especially true for those who had been interned by the Russians, at the start of the war. They already realized that they had traded the German occupation for a Russian occupation. They had experienced the Russian occupation of eastern Poland, when Russia was allied with Germany at the start of the war. This occupation would not end till 1990 and the end of the Cold War with the first free elections where Lech Wałęsa was elected president.

== Statistics ==
=== Losses inflicted on the enemy by the Regiment ===
Destroyed: 15 tanks – Tiger and Panzer IV

5 self-propelled guns
90 anti-tank guns – caliber 75, 76, 88 mm

Total: 110 pieces of enemy equipment

Prisoners

22 officers
2563 other ranks

Total: 2585 enemy soldiers

=== Regiment Losses ===
Soldiers

killed: 10 officers, 46 other ranks
wounded: 26 officers, 121 other ranks
missing: 5 other ranks

Total: 208 soldiers

Equipment

Destroyed by anti-tank guns: 43 Sherman tanks
Destroyed by anti-tank mines: 10 Sherman tanks

Total: 53 Sherman tanks

== Bibliography ==
- 1 Pułk Pancerny w latach 1939-1946 [The 1st Polish Armoured Regiment, 1939–1946] (PDF) (in Polish). Hanover: Wydawnictwo Polskiego Związku Wychodźstwa Przymusowego w Hanowerze. 1946.
- (in Polish) 1 PUŁK PANCERNY W WALCE OD CAEN PO WILHELMSHAVEN (The 1ST Armoured Regiment in Action from Caen to Wilhelmshaven), preface by Col. Franciszek Skibiński (Commander 10th Armoured Cavalry Brigade), authored by unknown regimental historian, published 1945
- WITH THE TANKS OR THE 1ST POLISH-ARMOURED-DIVISION, Published 1946, H.L. SMIT & ZN. – HENGELO (O.) – HOLLAND, K. JAMAR
- Abarinov, Vladimir (1991). The Murderers of Katyn. New York: Hippocrene Books. ISBN 978-0-7818-0032-7.
- Hope, Michael (2005). Polish Deportees in the Soviet Union: Origins of Post-war Settlement in Great Britain. London: Veritas Foundation Publication Centre. ISBN 978-0-948202-76-6.
- Hope, Michael (2005). The Abandoned Legion: A Study of the Background and Process of the Post-War Dissolution of Polish Forces in the West. London: Veritas Foundation Publication Centre. ISBN 978-1-904639-09-1.
- Jarymowycz, Roman Johann (2001). Tank Tactics: From Normandy to Lorraine. Boulder, Colorado: Lynne Rienner. ISBN 978-1-55587-950-1.
- Koskodan, Kenneth K. (2009). No Greater Ally: The Untold Story of Poland's Forces in World War II. Oxford: Osprey Publishing. ISBN 978-1-84603-365-0.
- Lalak, Zbigniew (2004). Broń pancerna w PSZ 1939-1945. Organizacja i struktury [Armour of the Polish Forces in the West, 1939–1945: Organization and structure] (in Polish). Warsaw: Pegaz-Bis/O.K. Media. ISBN 83-922002-0-9.
- McGilvray, Evan (2005). The Black Devils' March - A Doomed Odyssey - The 1st Polish Armoured Division 1939-45. Solihull, West Midlands: Helion. ISBN 978-1-874622-42-0.
