= 10th Dragoons =

The 10th Dragoons or 10th Dragoon Regiment may refer to the following military units:

- 10th Royal Hussars, a former British Army cavalry regiment: previously the 10th Regiment of Dragoons and the 10th (Prince of Wales's Own) Regiment of (Light) Dragoons
- 10th Brant Dragoons, a Canadian Army regiment active 1909-1936: previously the 25th Brant Dragoons
