= 10th Armoured Cavalry Brigade (Poland) =

- 10 Brygada Kawalerii Pancernej
- Active: 1939-40; 1942-c.1947(?); 1995-
- Country: Poland
- Branch: Polish Army
- Type: Armoured
- Size: Brigade
- Part of: 11th Armoured Cavalry Division

The Polish 10th Armoured Cavalry Brigade (Polish: 10 Brygada Kawalerii Pancernej) was an armoured formation of the Polish Armed Forces in the West. It was organized in France during World War II as part of the Polish Army in France, mostly by veterans of the 10th Motorized Cavalry Brigade who managed to escape from German and Soviet occupied Poland. Led by General Stanisław Maczek, it took part in the Battle of France in May 1940. It was later reformed in Great Britain as a part of the 1st Armoured Division.

== 1939-40 ==
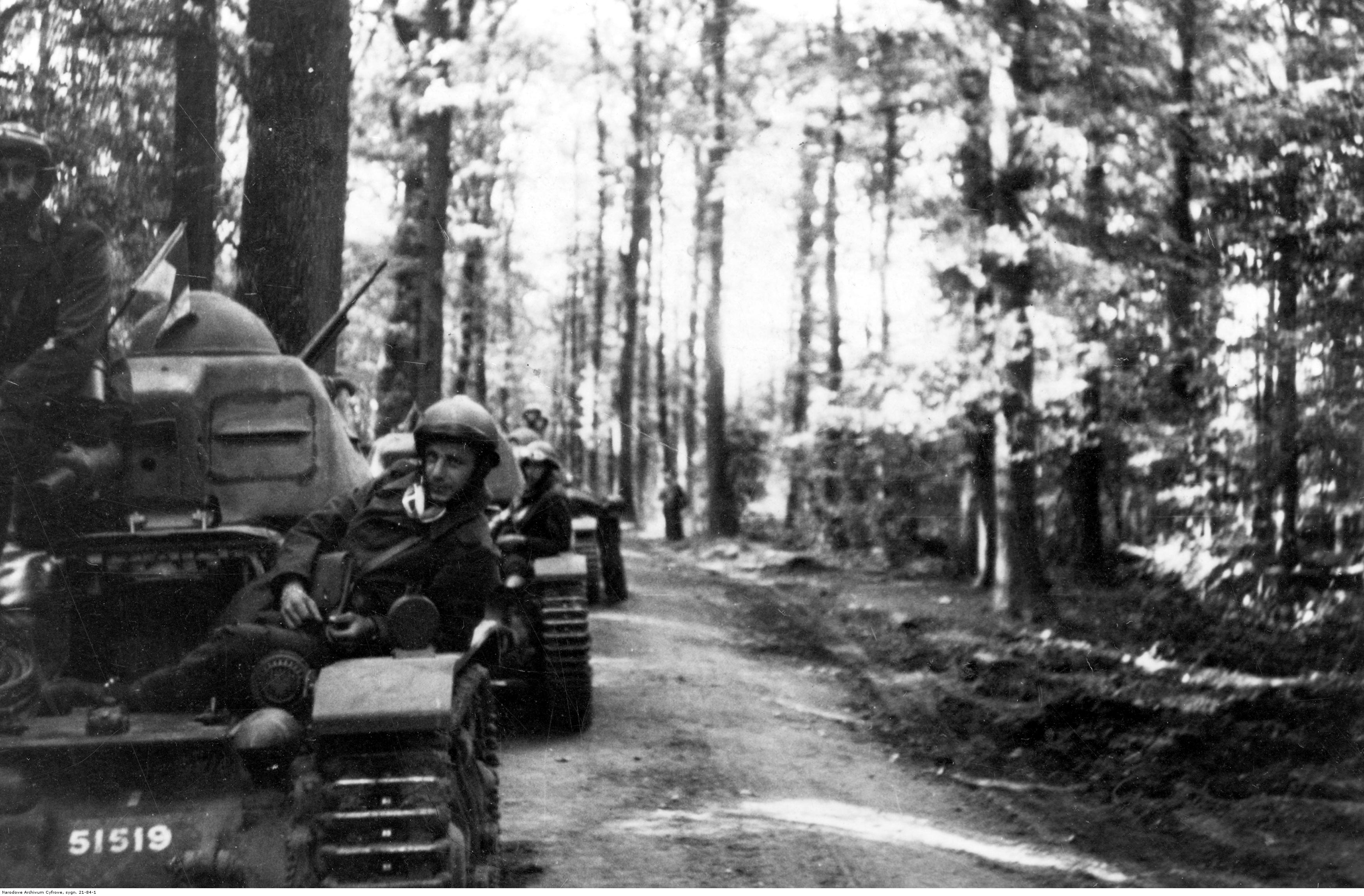
R35 tanks of the 1st Polish battalion of tanks in France, June 1940.

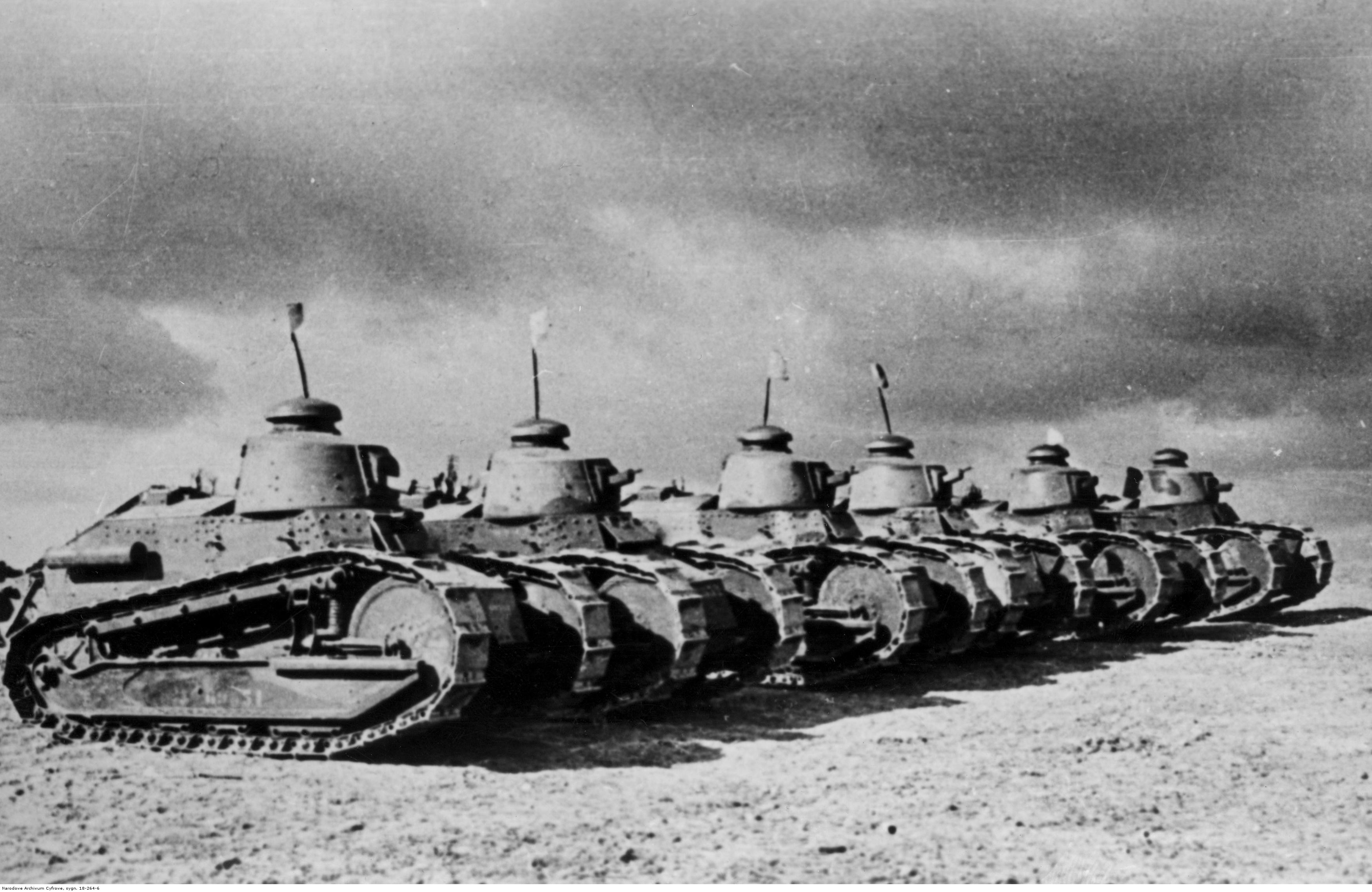

Under the terms of the Franco-Polish Military Alliance, France and Poland were allies in the lead-up to World War II. After Poland was defeated by Germany in September 1939, many Polish soldiers made their way to France where a new Polish Army in France was created to continue the fight against the Germans. These forces were commanded by General Władysław Sikorski, who was also Prime Minister of the Polish government in exile. French generals were not, however, interested in Polish information about the German tactics of Blitzkrieg displayed in the campaign in Poland. There was a general belief among the French High Command that the Polish armed forces had been incompetent, as well as a continuing belief in the impregnability of the Maginot Line. When General Maczek and his veterans tried to create a Polish mechanized division, they were not able to procure the equipment necessary for rapid training, so the new unit developed very slowly.

This state of affairs changed when Germany invaded the Low Countries in 1940, out-flanking the French fortifications. General Maczek's unit suddenly received all the equipment they had asked for on condition: that they go into action immediately. This proved impossible because many Polish soldiers were unfamiliar with their new equipment and there was no time for training. General Maczek decided to lead a small force of his best trained men, hoping that the rest of his unit would join them later. That small force, comprising veterans of the 10th Motorized Cavalry Brigade (the so-called "Black Brigade"), was now renamed the 10th Armoured Cavalry Brigade (10 Brygada Kawalerii Pancernej). On June 6, the brigade had one tank battalion, two strong motorized cavalry squadrons, one anti-tank battery and one anti-aircraft battery.

The brigade was attached to the French Fourth Army near Reims and ordered to cover its left flank. However, Maczek's unit was much too weak to hold back full German armoured divisions successfully. Polish soldiers managed to cover only one retreating French infantry division by attacking German forces in Champaubert-Montgivroux. Later, the brigade had to withdraw along with French troops and joined the French XXIII Corps. On June 16 the brigade attacked by night the town of Montbard over the Burgundy Canal. Maczek's soldiers completely surprised the Germans and took many prisoners.

The brigade was by this time fighting alone, with the French units on both flanks either routed or in retreat. There were no French forces to exploit its victory and the decimated Polish unit found itself surrounded by the enemy and without fuel. On June 18, General Maczek decided to destroy most of his equipment and withdraw on foot. Later that day he split the remnants of his brigade into small groups, so they could pass more easily through enemy lines. Many of Maczek's men, including the general himself, found their way to Great Britain where a Polish armoured unit was eventually recreated, while others joined the Polish and French resistance organizations in France and Belgium.

== Formation in Britain and Post Cold War ==
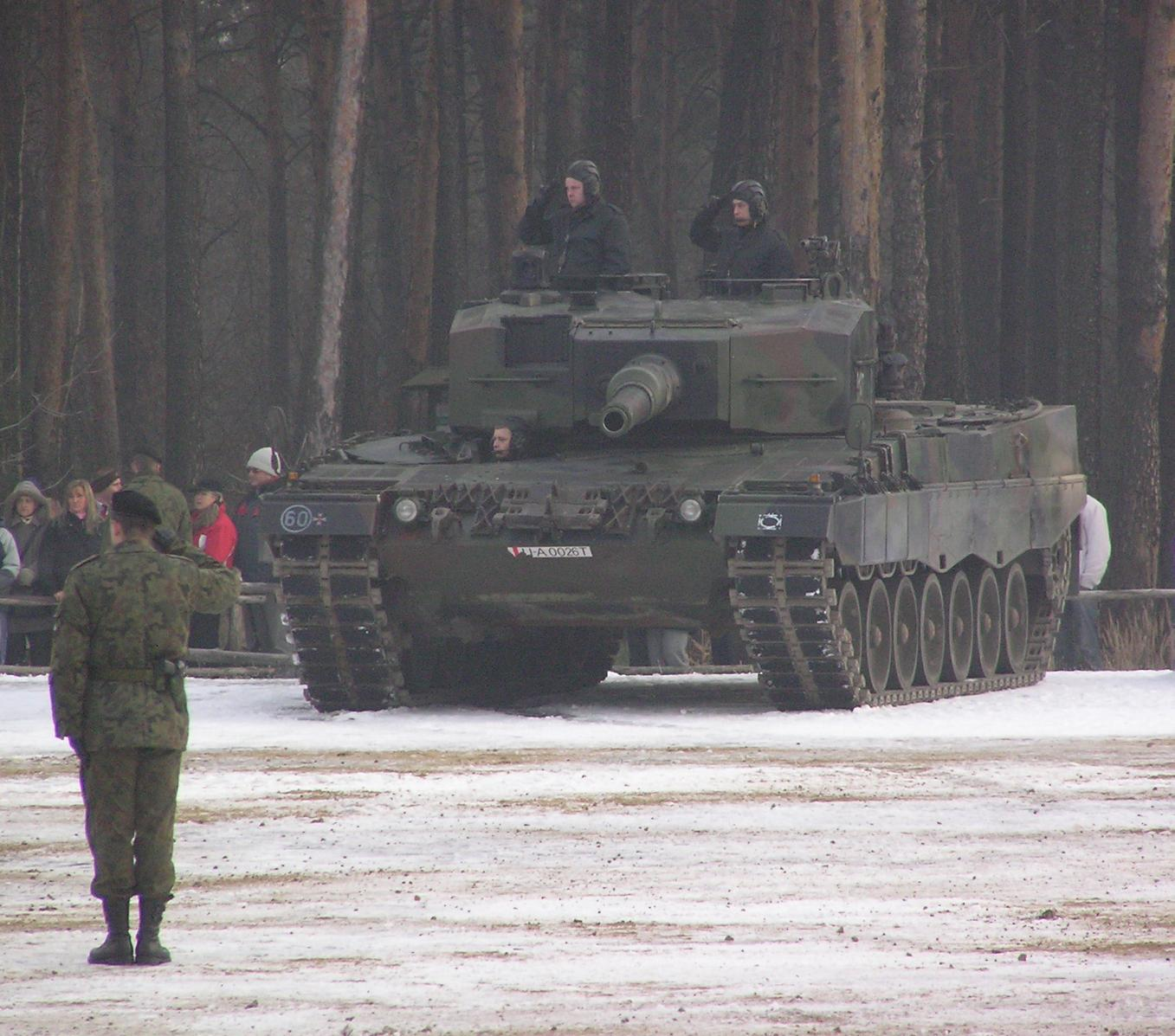
Leopard 2A4 of the brigade, December 2005

The 10th Armoured Cavalry Brigade was a small formation; most of its soldiers, after reaching Britain, formed part of General Maczek's 1st Armoured Division created in February 1942.

The brigade fought as part of the 1st Armoured Division in north-west Europe in 1944-45, but was disbanded after the war.

However it was reformed in 1995 and later equipped with Leopard 2 tanks purchased from Germany (see pl:10 Brygada Kawalerii Pancernej (III RP)). It is now part of the 11th Armoured Cavalry Division headquartered at Żagań.
