= Breton bidet =

Horse breed from France

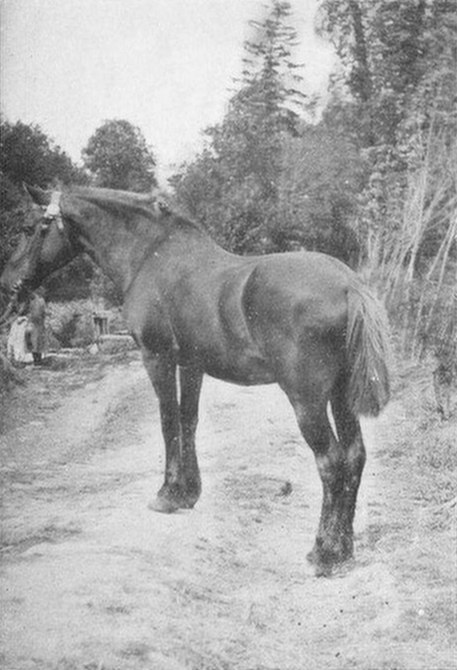
- Lignol, a 23-year-old Breton bidet, from a photograph published in 1931.
- Country of origin: France, Britanny
- Use: Saddle and pack horse

Traits
- Height: From 1.30 m to 1.45 m
- Color: Generally chestnut, more often roan, buckskin, grullo with markings on the legs. Bay, gray and black variations also possible.

The Breton bidet is a type of bidet, a small horse bred in Brittany. Characterized by its ability to move at amble, and bred for its working strength, the bidet has been around since the 5th century. In the Middle Ages, it may have been crossed with oriental horses brought by the House of Rohan. Widespread in Brittany until the mid-nineteenth century, bidets were used for all work requiring a low-value horse. The Haras Nationaux fought against this breeding. Transportation modernized in the 19th century, making the draft horse more sought after. The Breton bidet disappeared at the dawn of the 20th century.

These small horses, measuring 1.30 m to 1.45 m in height, are generally chestnut in color. Reputed to be ugly, they have great stamina and proverbial resistance to effort. Bidets are mainly used for saddling or as packhorses, but some are also known for their racing abilities. They are bred in southern and central Brittany, near Briec, Carhaix, Loudéac, and on the Morbihan coast.

== History ==
The Breton bidet has the particularity of going amble, which has earned it the name "bidet d'allures" throughout its history. The Breton word for an ambling bidet is inkané (incâne according to the old spelling).

=== Origin ===
The Breton bidet seems to have been used by the Celtic warriors who occupied Armorica in ancient times: according to Commandant Saint-Gal de Pons, the Celts migrated with small horses with a primitive coat (buckskin or grullo with markings), which formed the stock of the Breton bidet. Popular belief, supported by several scholars, has it that these bidets are descended from Arabian horses brought back from the Crusades, but a few sources mention the presence of racing bidets going amble before that time. In 880, Landévennec abbot Gurdisten cites in the Cartulaire de Landévennec an amble race that took place four centuries before him, between Riwal the Duke of Dumnonia and his cousin Fragan. He refers to earlier authors who were eyewitnesses. According to Guy de Sallier Dupin, an ambler bidet existed in Brittany before any Arab influence, as early as the 5th century. It may well have influenced the Norman bidet, or have a common origin with it.

Externally, bidets are reminiscent of the Barb horse, leading some 19th-century writers to speculate that they "may have been crossbred". Historian Guy de Sallier Dupin has noted several references to an Arab origin in his work, but also some oppositions, particularly from Éphrem Houël, for whom the Breton bidet is a native breed whose appearance is simply the result of a semi-feral lifestyle, soil and climate. A historical study of the peasants of Central Brittany reveals no evidence of large numbers of imported horses before the 19th century, apart from nine Arab stallions taken from Egypt by the de Rohan family during the Crusades, and brought back to their fiefdom in Brittany in 1213. It is possible, however, that Breton bidets bred on the Rohan family's lands were sometimes crossed with Oriental stallions. Guy de Sallier Dupin notes a correspondence from the 15th century, in which a Rohan son-in-law of François II deals with the Turks to import horses, falcons and greyhounds.

=== From the Middle Ages to the 19th century ===
Historically, Breton bidets have been sought after for their amble, which they either know naturally or are taught. This particular gait made them popular in the Middle Ages.

They live wild or semi-feral in forests and on moors. According to Commandant Antoine-Auguste Saint-Gal de Pons, medieval prints show horses measuring between 1.36 m and 1.45 m in height, notably in depictions of the Duc de Richemont. An unverifiable tradition has it that several oriental horses contemporary with Godolphin Arabian (1730), perhaps of the Barb breed, influenced the livestock in Brittany's Lorge forest.

Road improvements in Brittany in the 18th century led to changes in the bidets bred on the coast, as they were considered bad horses. This made them faster and stronger, better suited to pulling, and represented the beginnings of the development of the Breton draft horse. Genuine bidets are generally described as ugly, small and miserable, despite their working strength. After the French Revolution, the Haras Nationaux lost interest in the mountainous regions of inland Brittany where they were bred, and made no imported stallions available: the large horses brought by the stud farms from northern Europe were not suited to the size of the "bidettes". As far back as 1756, an edict ordered breeders to trim or cut off one ear of superior quality animals, so as to differentiate them more quickly. Similarly, in 1762, an order was issued to eliminate the stallions of local farmers who bred bidets. As a result, many horses were castrated on authority.

The animal has a bad reputation in the memories of the time, although some documents report crossbreeding with Barb horses and an Arabian stallion in 1785. In 1780, 12 bidets were selected in the arrondissements of Quimper and Châteaulin, indicating that these animals had been selected for the native population. In 1819, bidets were still a source of prosperity in the country, and their numbers increased, as did their size, while their conformation improved.

=== Conflict between farmers and the Haras Nationaux ===
At the beginning of the 19th century, the majority of Breton farmers still owned bidets. Many bred these smaller horses to avoid having them requisitioned by the army, since a minimum size was required. According to anthropologist Philippe Lacombe, the Haras Nationaux are engaged in a process of "nationalization" and "civilization" of animals and people, as they attack bidet breeding, which is being "stigmatized". The Breton bidet, decried by the French stud farm administration for its lack of elegance, is, in their view, the embodiment of peasant gaucherie. Yann Brekilien speaks of a "merciless struggle" to impose standards in defiance of the real needs of Brittany's inhabitants. Théophile de Pompéry is equally critical, saying (in 1851) that the stud system confuses and deteriorates horse breeds by denying their regional particularities.

For Guy de Sallier Dupin, the work of the Haras Nationaux is more nuanced. The Breton bidet really improved over the course of the century, through crossbreeding with bidets from the Midi region and then with Thoroughbreds and Arabians. The distribution of premiums by the Conseil Général and the Haras Nationaux, rewarding the best breeders, led to the emergence of pioneers who bred half-bloods, notably in Corlay, where the Corlay horse was born. The stud officer in charge of Langonnet between 1837 and 1847, Éphrem Houël, reports on numerous efforts to force farmers to breed larger animals.

=== Disappearance ===
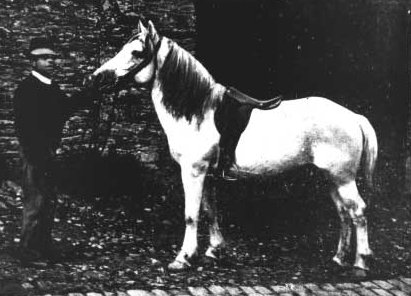
Breton saddle bidet, from a photograph published in the early 20th century

Opinions differ as to the precise date of the disappearance of Breton bidets. According to Mikael Bodlore-Penlaez and Divi Kervella, the last true bidets disappeared in the 1850s. However, in 1897, Martial Cornic testifies to a clear distinction between the Breton draft breed and the bidet. At the beginning of the 20th century, according to René Musset and Camille Vallaux (1907), Breton bidets were "no more than a memory", while a 1910 issue of the Journal d'agriculture pratique spoke of a "plan to halt the disappearance of the Breton bidet". Other, more mainstream sources date their disappearance to the World War I, due to the demands of the French army.

Several reasons are cited for this disappearance: modernization of transport, crossbreeding with hot-blooded or draft horses, and the influence of Haras Nationaux. Evidence from the period shows that the Breton bidet became much less sought-after, at least in central Cornouaille and Morbihan. The state of the roads led to the widespread use of horse-drawn vehicles. Around 1859, these small horses were no longer used except in their country of birth, despite their qualities of sobriety and robustness. They were replaced by Breton draft horses from Léon and Trégor: "the transformation of the old Breton bidet by crossbreeding was decided and hastened by road construction", according to Camille Vallaux. Crossbreeding with blood horses also led to an evolution of the breed "towards blood". According to Yann Brekilien and Thierry Jigourel, it was the Haras Nationaux's action against the breeding of bidets that led directly to the disappearance of this little horse throughout Brittany, an analysis previously defended by Jacques Charpy, director of the Finistère archives.

Public action by the stud farms encouraged cross-breeding, notably with Norfolks, but also with stallions from Boulonnais, Ardennais, Percheron, etc., causing the Breton bidet to evolve in the course of the 19th century into the larger Breton draft horse.

According to history professor Bernard Denis, bidets disappeared without giving rise to any breeds, but they did influence some. The Centre-Montagne, also known as the "petit trait Breton", originated in the mountainous areas of Brittany where bidets were bred. It is the smallest variety of the Breton breed. It was included in the breed's recognized types in 1927, along with the trait and the postier breton. At the time, it stood around 1.40 m tall. It is said to be descended from mountain bidets, and to have survived "because there have always been breeders to ride horses in the mountains". However, the Centre-Montagne also disappeared in the 1980s.

== Description ==
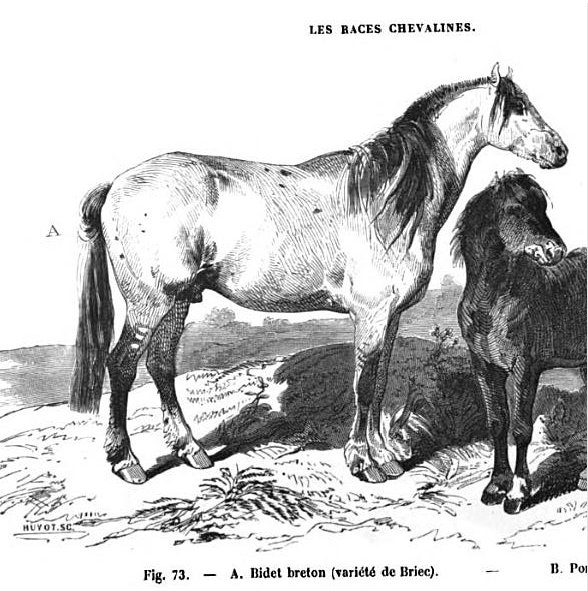
Briec bidet, from an engraving dated 1861

The Breton bidet is probably a small, primitive type of horse, comparable to the Sorraia pony from Portugal and the Fjord from Norway. These animals are not very homogeneous. According to Mikael Bodlore-Penlaez and Divi Kervella, there are four types of Breton bidet. The Briec bidet (Kezeg Kernev bidochenn), bred in Cornouaille, hence its other name of "Cornouaille bidet", has enjoyed great popularity. Mountain bidet (Kezeg-menez) comes from the eastern Monts d'Arrée. The Landes bidet (Kezeg-lann) is bred in Loudéac, near Rennes. They also include the small Ushant horse (Kezeg bihan Eusa), considered differently by other authors. In Loire-Atlantique, a heathland and woodland bidet is described at the end of the Ancien régime, near Derval and Blain.

=== Height ===
The height is generally small, averaging 1.30 m to 1.45 m, with some horses even smaller. At the end of the Ancien Régime, the height of Breton bidet was from 1.24 m to 1.30 m, according to contemporary sources. In 1840, Count Achille de Montendre estimated this height at between 1.35 m and 1.52 m, pointing out that the biggest are rarely the best. Two years later, Eugène Gayot estimated the average height of bidets at between 1.38 m and 1.40 m. A larger, stronger bidet is called a "double-bidet". Mountainous countries produce bidets from 1.20 m to 1.40 m at most. The bidet from Derval and Blain barely exceeds 1.20 m, and the small horse from Ushant is the size of a Shetland pony.

=== Morphology ===
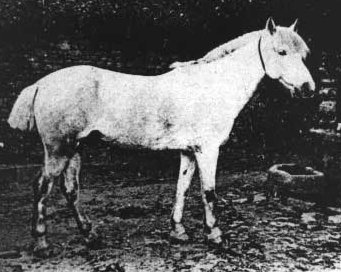
Marc'h Land, a 1.48 m Breton bidet, from an early 20th-century photograph published in the magazine Sport universel illustré

All bidets are frustratingly inelegant, thin and dry animals. They are often puny and angular, with a short, stocky build. Animals from the Carhaix area are more angular and slightly taller than those from Briec and Châteauneuf. Briec bidets have a fleshier, better-planted neck, a squarer head and rounder ribs.

==== Head ====
While some authors describe the head of Breton bidets as small, others describe it as large and poorly attached, fairly strong, square, with a cambered nose, dry and usually flat. The forehead is broad and flat, with open gables. The eyes are bright, but those of stallions tend to be hidden by thick eyelids. The nostrils are wide open, and the ears are small and well placed.

==== Body ====
The neck is short and strong, curved or straight, and fairly slender. It is often axed and spiked. The withers are round, underdeveloped and not very prominent. Shoulders are dry, body rounded, ample, short and compact. The chest is broader than it is deep. The loins are straight and short. The rump is well-fleshed, rounded and low, or swallowed/folded. The tail is short and set high, well detached on the move.

==== Limbs ====
Limbs are strong and short, lean, well joined, with broad, flat, well sunken hocks. The forearms are long, and the legs of the forelegs are said to be "perfect". The hocks are sometimes closed (hooked), especially in mountain horses, whose topline is reminiscent of that of the mule. Joints are good. The fetlocks are full of hair, but without long dewlaps (some authors attest to the total absence of dewlaps). The hooves are very well conformed, although some horses have "panard" or "crochard" legs.

=== Coat ===
According to most descriptions, the most common coat is chestnut, in various shades. Dark manes (in red tones) are preferred, as horses with washed-out manes are generally castrated; however, the actual presence of washed-out manes is frequent. There are also dapple-gray, strawberry roan, grullo with markings on the legs. These primitive characteristics, notably the mouse-gray coat, are shared by many of Europe's ancient horse breeds. Bidets from the Loudéac area can also be bay, or more rarely black.

=== Temperament, care and gait ===
Trotting bidets have long, lively gaits. They work well into old age, without their legs or limbs suffering, while making do with little food, usually a supplement of crushed gorse and very little hay in winter. They live outside on the moors, without shelter.

"The Breton bidet is satisfied with what Mother Nature offers: a little hay, crushed heath, exceptionally bran and a few measures of oats. A marvel of a horse [...]". – Alexandre Bouët

This sobriety would have earned the Breton bidet the nickname of "France's Cossack" during the Russian campaign, but Guy de Sallier Dupin casts doubt on the veracity of this Napoleonic statement.

The Derval bidet is reputed to be "of astounding vigor, sobriety and robustness". Yann Brekilien also testifies to the qualities of hardiness, docility, resistance and courage that are uncommon in Breton bidets. Period documents are full of praise for its vigor and stamina, evoking "surprising" means despite its small size, unfailing hardiness, exceptional endurance and ability to bear the weight of traction. A testimonial published in the press in 1894 reported that one bidet covered forty leagues in one day, with no signs of fatigue.

== Usage ==
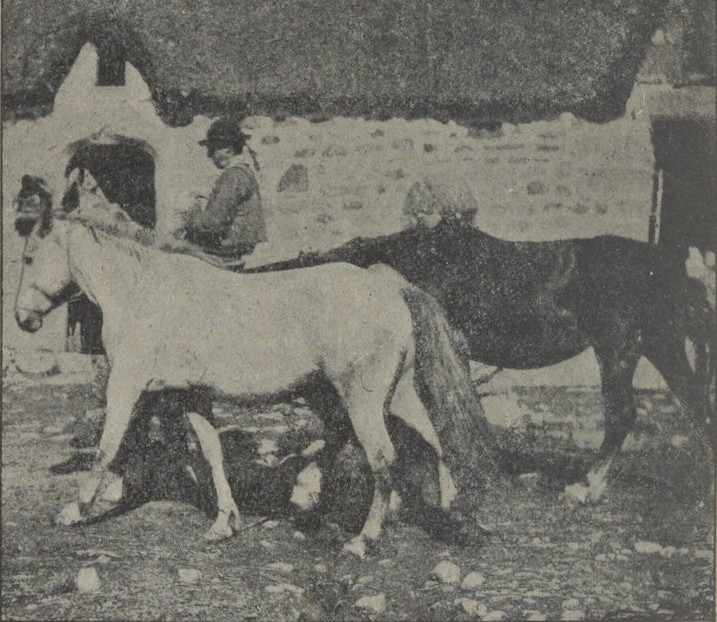
Breton bidets in Zootechnie. Races chevalines by Paul Diffloth, 1923

The Breton bidet has seen many uses as a pack horse, saddle horse, and more exceptionally as a racehorse or traction horse.

Breton bidets were used in the trenches during the World War I, where 50,000 died.

=== Saddle and packhorse ===
Breton bidets are mainly used at work, for carrying people or materials. Breton bidets carry all kinds of loads: grain, flour, salt, coal, linen, canvas or slate tiles. Peasants used the "double-bidet" to carry flour sacks over rough roads. At the beginning of the 19th century, the Breton bidet was, "in France, the mount of almost all those whose profession required them to ride daily". According to Éphrem Houël, it was not uncommon for train bidets to cover distances of thirty to forty kilometers, at a rate of "twenty-four kilometers an hour". Yann Brekilien, who holds a diploma in equestrian tourism, believes that the Breton bidet would have made an excellent mount for equestrian tourism in Brittany, had it survived.

=== Military ===
Whether or not Breton bidets were integrated into Napoleon's army is a matter of debate. Although Brittany's horses were requisitioned in large numbers for this purpose, it's unlikely that they were bidets, as they were too small for the purpose. In 1812, the mayor of Corlay observed that the horses in his commune were below army size. The horses used by Napoleon's army were probably crossbred animals, impregnated with Arab and Thoroughbred blood.

=== Pulling and plowing ===
Bidets are not suited to pulling or plowing, jobs long reserved for oxen. In 1825, some mayors reported in a survey the lack of aptitude of these small horses for draft work. Exceptionally, however, one may be placed in a team in front of the oxen, as reported by Chabert in the diocese of Vannes.

An anecdote is recorded in 1850. A senior English officer urgently requested transport between Lannion and Morlaix in the middle of winter. He called on a local valet, who showed up with a heavy carriage hitched to a puny bidet. At first, the Englishman refused to get in, fearing for his safety on the rough, snowy and icy ground. But the carriage proves so efficient that he offers the driver 125 francs, or five guineas, to buy a few hairs from his bidet. The Englishman had the manes framed alongside those of the thoroughbred Eclipse, as a tribute to "the bravest horse he had ever met".

=== Races ===
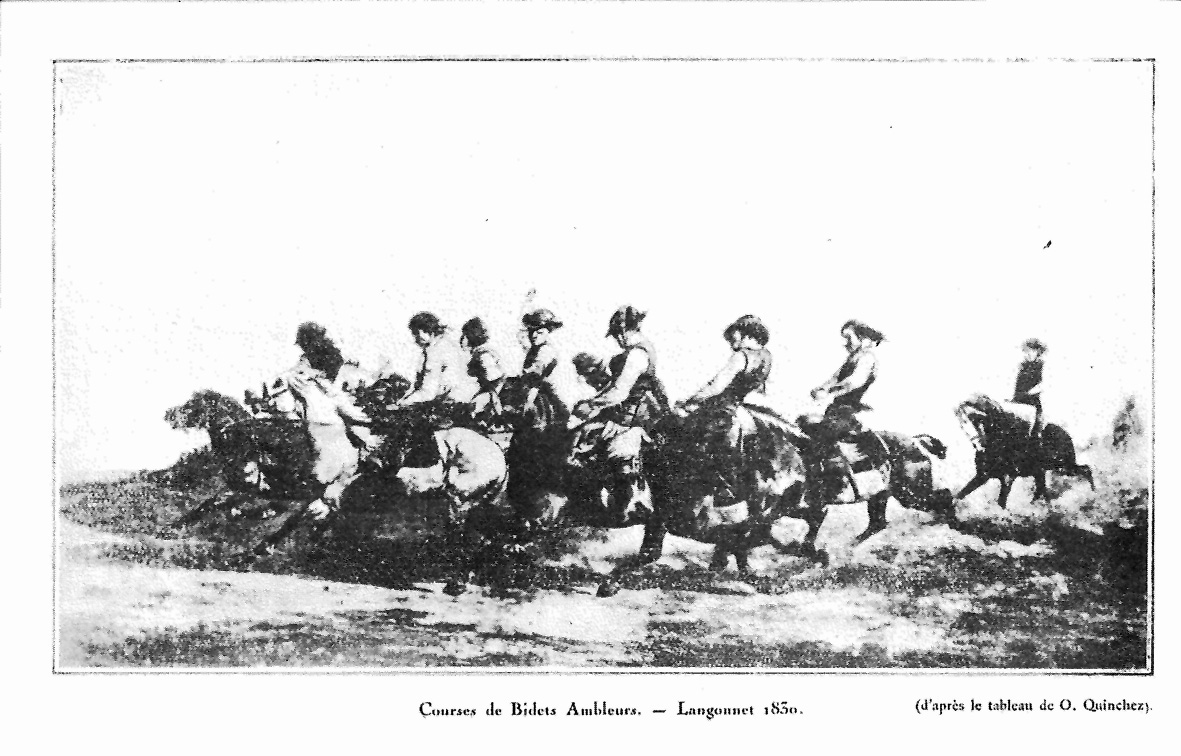
Amble bidet race at Langonnet in 1830

From 1806 onwards, local races were organized in Morbihan. For a time, bidets took part in these races in Brittany. They distinguished themselves at the Saint-Brieuc racecourse in 1807. The tradition of the "clocher à clocher" race, well documented by 19th-century folklorists, saw riders compete on local bidets. Those from the Breton mountains are ambleurs. Breton peasants also found plenty of opportunities to pit their horses against each other at weddings, pardons and other festivities. In Nantes in 1835, Breton bidets and Thoroughbreds shared the racecourse.

However, legends mingle with historical facts. Moggy, a "peasant bidet", is reputed to have beaten a Thoroughbred mare in a race between Saint-Brieuc and Guingamp. Sallier Dupin's critical study reveals that Moggy is not a pure-bred Breton bidet, having been bred from an Arabian horse. The opposing mare was not a thoroughbred, but a strolling mare, barely half-blood.

== Breeding spread ==
Breton bidets are common in southern and central Brittany. They are found around Briec and Carhaix, in the valleys and on the sunset of the Monts d'Arrée, and on the Morbihan coast, generally bred by fairly poor farmers. In the Côtes d'Armor region, bidets are mainly raised in the arrondissement of Loudéac near Corlay, Gouarec, a few communes around Mûr-de-Bretagne, in the south of the arrondissement of Guingamp, at Saint-Nicolas-du-Pélem, Callac and Rostrenen. This type of breeding continues in areas where the nature of the pastures does not allow for the greater needs of draft horses. Farms have one or two mares. Briec bidets were particularly expensive in the early 19th century, with the price of a good animal rising to 800 francs.

Breton bidets were widely exported. In the 17th century, representatives of the breed were sent to New France (now Canada) at the instigation of the king. The Canadian horse breed still reflects this influence. At the beginning of the 20th century, bidets were sent to Cochinchina to be crossed with native mares.

A breeder in Haut Corlay is trying to revive the local bidet by crossing Breton draft horses with thoroughbreds. A first foal was approved by the Breton horse studbook in 2010.

== In the culture ==
The memory of bidets remains particularly vivid. A folk tale collected by Émile Souvestre, La Groac'h de l'île du Lok, tells of a stick that changes into "Saint-Thégonnec's red bidet" with an incantation:

"From Saint Vouga, remember!

Bidet de Léon, lead me

On the ground, in the air, on the water,

Wherever I must go!"

- Émile Souvestre, La Groac'h de l'île du Lok.

Painter Rosa Bonheur sketched a number of Breton bidets. Brittany regularly celebrates the memory of these little horses, an integral part of local history.

== See also ==
- Bidet horse
- List of French horse breeds
- Horses in Brittany

== Bibliography ==
- Barral, J. A. (1859). Journal d'agriculture pratique (in French). Vol. 1. Librairie agricole de la maison rustique.
- Moll, Louis; Gayot, Eugène Nicolas (1861). La Connaissance générale du cheval : études de zootechnie pratique, avec un atlas de 160 pages et de 103 figures (in French). Didot.
- Saint-Gal de Pons, Antoine-Auguste (1931). Origines du cheval breton. Le Haras de Langonnet. Les Dépôts de Lamballe et d'Hennebont. Le Dépôt de remonte de Guingamp (in French). Quimper: Celjoarion.
- Hervé, Patrick (1999). Chevaux de Bretagne. Petits cahiers bleus (in French) (4th ed.). Morlaix: Skol Vreizh. ISBN 2-911447-31-X.
- de Sallier Dupin, Guy (1998). Le Cheval chez les Bretons des Côtes-d'Armor : De l'Ancien Régime à la Grande Guerre (in French). Spézet: Coop Breizh.
- Bodlore-Penlaez, Mikael; Kervella, Divi (2011). Atlas de Bretagne – Atlas Breizh : géographie, culture, histoire, démographie, économie, territoires de vie des Bretons – douaroniezh, sevenadur, istor, poblans, ekonomiezh, tiriadou, buhez ar vretoned (in French). Spézet: Coop Breiz. ISBN 978-2-84346-496-6.
- Houël, Éphrem (1842). Traité complet de l'élève du cheval en Bretagne (in French). E. Tostain.
- Morvan, J. (1928). Le Cheval de trait et le bidet bretons (in French). Imprimerie du Réveil du Beaujolais. OCLC 47853265.
- Jigourel, Thierry (2017). Le cheval en Bretagne (in French). Coop Breizh. ISBN 978-2-84346-804-9.
- Charpy, Jacques (1961). Les Chevaux bretons au xviiie siècle (in French). Quimper: Bulletin de la Société archéologique du Finistère.
- Lizet, Bernadette (1989). La Bête noire : à la recherche du cheval parfait (in French). Paris: Éditions Maison des sciences de l'homme. p. 341. ISBN 2-7351-0317-X.
- Mulliez, Jacques (1999). "Essai sur le rapport éventuel entre " révolution agricole " et utilisation du cheval de labour". Annales de Bretagne et des pays de l'Ouest (in French). 106: 87–99. doi:10.3406/abpo.1999.4016.
