= Horses in Brittany =

Equine culture in Brittany

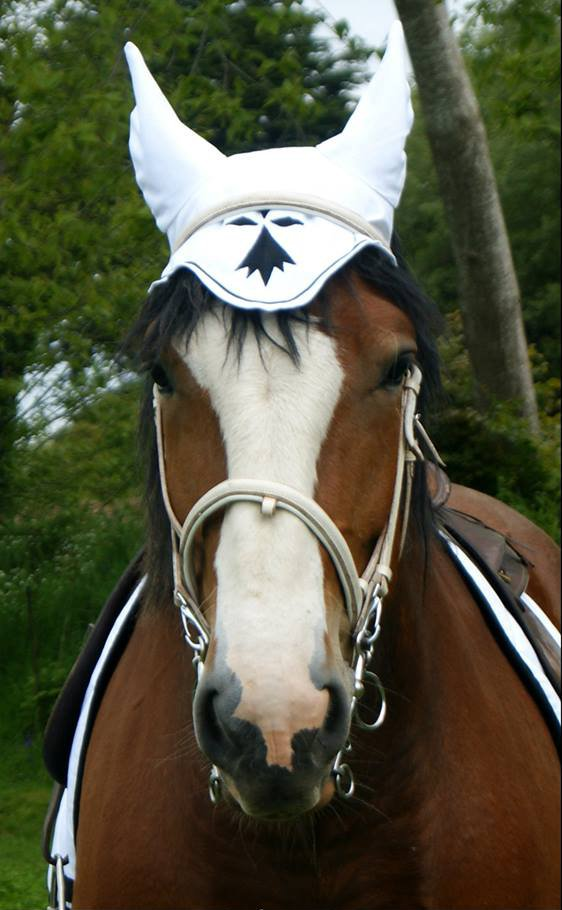
Breton mare decked out in the colors of Brittany

Horses in Brittany have a clear historical, economic and cultural importance, since their introduction often attributed to the Celts. In Brittany, the horse, generally a Breton bidet, was mainly used as a saddle animal until the middle of the 19th century. As roads improved, most breeders specialized in draft horses and carriage horses. They mainly settled in the west, in Basse-Bretagne, Trégor and Léon. The Breton draft horse, a renowned working animal, was exported in large numbers from Landivisiau in the early 20th century.

Horse breeding in Brittany also involved light breeds, notably the racehorses that sprang up with the proliferation of racecourses, in particular the Corlay horse. While Breton draft horse breeding remains predominant, equestrian sports are now well established. Once the draft horse of farmers and an auxiliary of the armed forces, the horse's role has changed, but it still evokes a strong attachment. Brittany boasts five equestrian centers, including the Haras Nationaux de Lamballe and d'Hennebont. The horse is at the heart of many Breton traditions, including pardons, tales, legends and songs.

== History ==
There are several theories about the arrival of the first Equus (ferus) caballus in Brittany. According to popular literature, the species was brought to Brittany by Aryan migrations from Asia over 4,000 years ago. One variant states that these Asian horses mingled with a local equine population. Whatever the case, the domestic horse arrived in Europe as part of Indo-European migrations, bringing with it profound cultural changes. Its presence in Armorica is certain around −750 / -1000; it probably increased around -500.

Brittany is renowned for the important place it has always held for the horse, and for its history as a land of equine breeding, just like Normandy, with which it frequently competed. Today's Finistère department (historic Basse-Bretagne) has the strongest connection with the horse, particularly the Pays de Léon. Throughout its history under the Ancien régime, Brittany has always exported horses. A number of sources are biased, as they emanate from the administration of the French national stud farms. According to Daniel Roche, these sources often refer to Brittany's horse population in terms of "abundance" and "mediocrity", despite the fact that local animals primarily met the needs of farmers living in Brittany. The general opinion at stud farms is that Bretons love horses, but don't know how to breed them.

=== Antiquity ===
Small horses were bred by Celtic warriors before they conquered Great Britain. There is very solid evidence of the importance of the horse among Celtic civilization, domesticated rather than hunted. Mainly a military animal, it became established in Armorica, as attested by numerous coins bearing its effigy, although there are no estimates of the horse population at the time.

On the other hand, Roman sources (notably Caesar) mention dietary taboos among Armorican tribes. Hippophagy was probably sacrilegious or illegal. The Romans were not a cavalier people. However, their cavalry units, mainly of foreign origin, particularly from North Africa, may have left their mark on the Breton horse.

=== Middle Ages ===
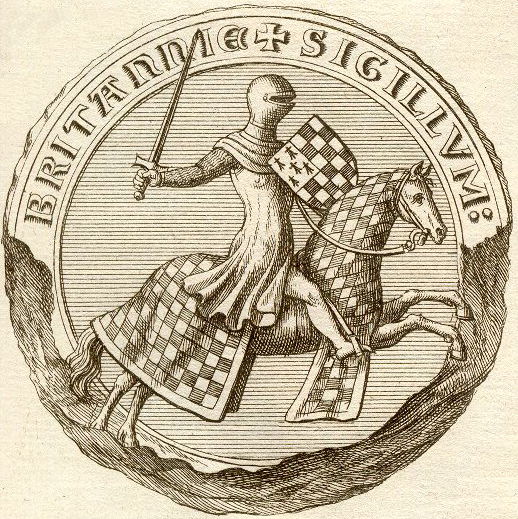
Seal of John I, Duke of Brittany

In the Middle Ages, the horse became the symbol of an aristocratic elite, due to its high cost of purchase and maintenance. Breeding efforts were undertaken to obtain the best possible animals, if necessary by importing foreign breeding stock at great expense. Well-documented breeding from the year 1,000 onwards was almost entirely in the hands of the seigneuries and religious communities, who competed with each other (peasants probably owned no more than one or two mares). The Duchy of Brittany was self-sufficient, even exporting. It gave birth to mounts whose quality is attested to by numerous sources. The palafre de Bretanha (in English Brittany's palfrey), was renowned beyond its borders. Throughout the Middle Ages, Brittany required large numbers of horses for military purposes. Only males were used, while females were put to stud. These animals were bred semi-feral, in forests and on moors, which probably made them very hardy. They are rounded up when needed by the subjects living on the breeding lands, as a chore. The lord chooses his animals first.

Around the year 1000, the Redon Abbey had its own stud farm. In 1108, the Vannes archives record that the abbot offered a horse to a certain Alain Fergent for 300 sous, an enormous sum at the time. In 1213, the House of Rohan (which also took a particular interest in horse breeding) obtained nine Egyptian stallions and placed them in the Quénécan and Poulancre forests. Olivier I de Rohan banned all exports of male horses from these Arab stallions. In 1225, Alain III de Rohan donated half of Quénécan's semi-feral horses to the Abbey du Bon Repos, which he had founded near Gouarec in 1184. A little later, the abbey was granted grazing rights on the same land. A chronicle states that Jean le Roux bought the town of Brest around 1260, in exchange for a white haquenée and 100 pounds of rent. In a deed signed in 1269, Aliénor de Porhoët, dame de la Chèze, ceded her wild studs in the Loudéac forest to the Rohans. The lands were distributed to some of their vassals to establish stud farms, so that by the end of the Middle Ages, the House of Rohan owned wild studs in Léon, Porhoët and Lanoué. In 1479, they owned 500 horses in the Loudéac forest alone. In 1300, the lord of Loudéac, Sevestre de la Feuillée, built his fortune partly on the horse trade. During the War of the Two Joan, 300 of Joanna of Flanders' knights' mounts came from Brech. The House of Laval also established stud farms, whose existence was confirmed in 1467, in the forest of Brecelien (Paimpont). In 1481, the Quimper nobility show counted over 4,000 horses. The Dukes of Brittany certainly encouraged the breeding and use of horses among their vassal lords, as chivalry required the possession and mastery of this animal.

Brittany's nobility often took great care to record gifts and bequests of horses in writing, giving details of their appearance, coat and name. For example, the Duke of Lancaster gave Bertrand du Guesclin a horse to thank him for his prowess at the siege of Dinan. It was on a Breton destrier that Du Guesclin is said to have overthrown sixteen opponents at the Place des Lices tournament in Rennes in 1338. On his death in 1380, his mounts were blessed by the imposition of the bishop's hands.

=== 16th and 17th centuries ===
The end of feudalism and the Wars of Religion in the 16th century led to a decline in horse breeding. Despite some evidence of continued breeding at the end of the 16th century, it seems that wild stud farms were in decline. Only a small group of horses was reported in the forest of Loudéac in 1613. A few wealthy landowners made their stallions available free of charge to their farmers and sharecroppers to perpetuate the species, but the attraction of court life in Paris led to the abandonment of these stud farms. From the 17th century onwards, the French influence was clearly felt. Until the end of the 19th century, many horses were imported to Brittany to "improve" the local stock, from Denmark, Holstein, Spain, Normandy and England. The shortage of horses in the kingdom of France became such that the National Studs were established to remedy the situation. In 1664, Jacques de Solleysel wrote that "every year, eight to ten thousand fairly common horses leave Basse-Bretagne; but the best ones come from the three bishoprics: Tréguier, Léon and Cornouaille; especially Tréguier, because it is considered certain that there are more than twenty thousand cavales in this bishopric alone. Judge from this that if we had had good stallions, instead of horses used for tidal chases and vans, we would have bred horses fit for war, hunting, and the crews of great lords; from which the individual and the public would derive a notable advantage, and three times that which they have had up to now". Two years later, on January 10, 1666, an edict from Colbert officially established national stud farms in Brittany:

No stallion, in principle, may stud unless he has been distributed, or at the request of the Parliament of Brittany, approved by the State, i.e. the gentlemen commissioners-inspectors.

— Jean-Baptiste Colbert, Edit du 10 janvier 1666 pour la création de l'institution des Haras de Bretagne

The measure was belatedly passed by the Parliament of Brittany in 1685. Around 20,000 pounds were invested to buy stallions abroad, then entrust them to stallion guards scattered throughout the province. Gabriel Calloet-Kerbrat criticized local breeders for feeding their animals Vegetables and plants instead of oats and hay, and for breeding them too early. He recommended crossing the Breton mare with stallions from Germany and England, noting that 7,000 to 8,000 animals were exported every year. This theory of crossbreeding to improve breeds was in line with the ideas of the time. Le Boucher du Crosco, a member of Brittany's Royal Academy of Agriculture, was highly critical of Breton horses, finding them undistinguished and too small (between 1.15 m and 1.52 m). He proposed a plan to ensure trade for the province, including the establishment of horse racing based on the English model. Similarly, in 1700, the general manager of the Pontchartrain stud farm pointed out the difficulty of finding good animals. The regulations governing the stud farms to "improve" the horses were applied by imposing constraints on the premises. In 1689, Desclouzeaux, intendant of the Brest stud farm, spoke of the "light fines" he imposed on owners of "mediocre" bidets caught roaming and covering mares.

Horse exports doubled between the 17th and 18th centuries. Statistics compiled in 1690 show that 334 national stallions were distributed, including 109 in the bishoprics of Saint-Pol-de-Léon, Tréguier and Nantes, resulting in the birth of 8,500 foals in the same year.

=== 18th century ===
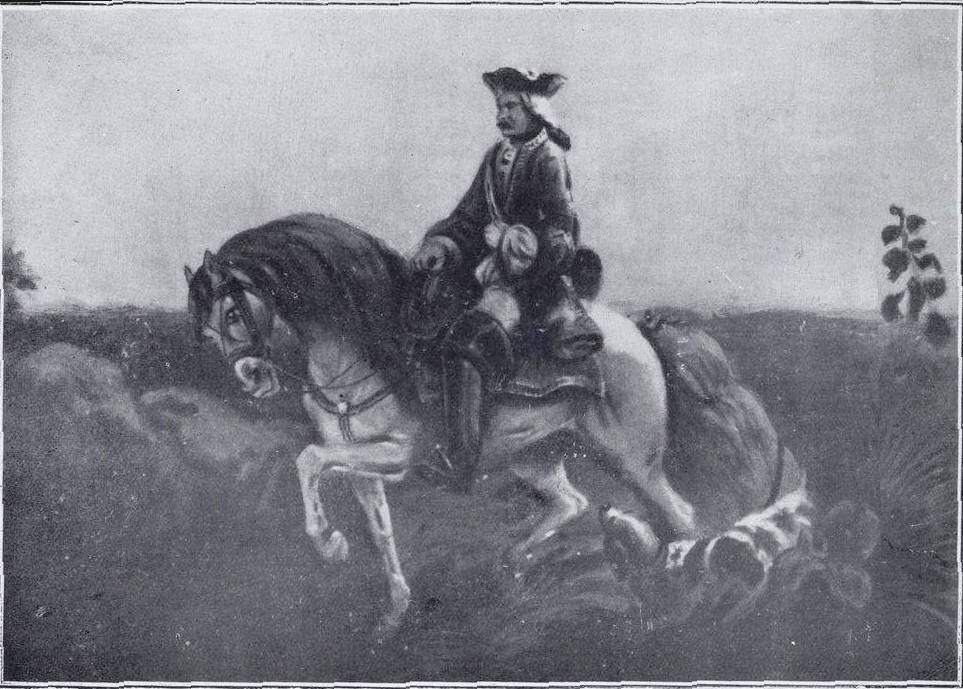
Breton lord out hunting

In the 18th century, horse-drawn vehicle developed rapidly. Adapted infrastructures were created: inns and post riders, which required spare horses. The improvement of roads in Brittany led to the modification of the bidet, considered a bad horse, to make it faster and stronger, better suited to traction: these were the beginnings of Breton draft horse breeding. In 1758, the main roads were established in the province, and in June 1776, a regular horse-drawn transport service provided stagecoach connections between various towns in Brittany. Breeders became leaders in workhorse breeding. This flourishing production made the Pays de Léon, in what is now northern Finistère, one of the region's finest producers. In 1715, a stud farm inspector visited Léon and reported that horses were bred "wild" and thrifty, left to roam freely on vast pastures in all weathers: they were still bred wild on uncultivated moors. In 1768, 28,000 horses were exported from Brittany. Other sources, from Gallois de la Tour and the Intendant de Nointel, each mention around 12,000 horses exported each year. Two types emerge: the "cheval de Léon", or Léonais, bulkier and closer to the draft horse, and the "cheval du Conquet", lighter and more courser-like. At the end of the Ancien Régime, Chabert reveals the changes in breeding conditions in the Léon region. Henceforth, horses lived in "crèches", sheltered from the elements. Breeding evolved from a wild system to an artificial one. The number of horses also rose sharply in the mid-18th century, from 164,000 in the 1733 census to 201,868 in the 1754 census.

==== Stud farm administration under the Ancien Régime ====
In his memoirs, the Duc d'Estrées refers to the birth of 24,000 horses each year in Brittany, and to the French government's annual investment of 30,000 pounds in this breeding program until 1717. The regulations governing the administration of provincial stud farms were published in 1717, with the preamble stating that Brittany was the region of the kingdom of France "most suitable for breeding and feeding horses". French state intervention was very strict towards local breeders, who were fined if their mares were not presented to inspectors, or if their own stallions were caught roaming free. After the death of Louis XIV, the Estates of Brittany protested against the financing of foreign stallions. Eager to regain their independence, they demanded to choose their own inspectors and stallions. The funds were abolished, then re-established in 1727. Stud horses were marked with an ermine on the buttock, surmounted by the initial of the bishopric where they were stationed. From 1727 to 1761, hundreds of foreign stallions were imported to influence the Breton herd. No changes were visible, and crossbreeding was often a failure. The 1.65 m stallions acquired abroad were unable to breed with local "bidettes" averaging 1.32 men, ruining farmers whose foals sold poorly. By 1755, the importance of choosing the right broodmare had been established, and 250 foreign mares were brought to Brittany. Despite all this cross-breeding, most of Brittany's horses regained their ancestral characteristics. However, in 1762, Fleuriot de La Fruglaye lamented the disappearance of the Cornouaille Breton bidet due to crossbreeding.

This situation created a distaste for the stud farm administration and foreign stallions. The national stud farms gradually lost interest in the mountainous regions of inland Brittany, where no imported stallions were available. However, in 1762, an order was issued to suppress the stallions of local farmers who bred bidets: the report by Monseigneur l'évêque de Vannes advocated the distribution of premiums to the most beautiful 3- and 4-year-old foals in each Breton bishopric, discriminating against local bidets to force farmers to breed another breed. In 1756, an edict ordered breeders to trim or cut off an ear to differentiate superior quality animals. A memorandum submitted in 1774 attests to the numerous instances of resistance to this coercive regulation by the stud farms. In 1781, Intendant Caze de la Bove blamed "the laziness and routine of the Bretons [who] do not seek to crossbreed". From 1785 to 1787, deliberations led to the creation of 9 new stud farms in Brittany, distributed among the various bishoprics. In 1789, a stud established in Saint-Pol-de-Léon was populated with Neapolitan horses.

==== Revolutionary period ====
On January 29, 1790, stud farms were abolished in Brittany, as in the rest of France, much to the relief of farmers, many of whose grievances have been preserved. When the French Revolution came, the large number of requisitions and the abandonment of breeding by the nobility dealt a heavy blow to this economy. The royal stallions were auctioned off by the Estates of Brittany. The district of Saint-Brieuc was the first to sell all its stallions, on December 1, 1790. The Dinan district sold one stallion out of three at the beginning of 1791, leaving the remaining two-thirds to be used by the parishes. In Brest, seven stallions were sold on January 3.

The Constituent assembly dissolved the stud farms without proposing any replacement, against a backdrop of increasing demand and declining livestock production. Requisitions followed one another. In 1793, the mass levy gave rise to the Chouannerie movement. Breton municipalities and farmers were torn between the demands of the Republic and Chouanne resistance. On 10 Germinal An VIII (March 31, 1800), a requisition decided in Rennes demanded 962 horses from the Côtes-du-Nord department alone. Resistance was organized, with horse dealers buying horses from farmers for resale in neighboring regions. A new order extended the requisition to horses aged 4 years and measuring less than 4 feet 6 inches (1.37 m). The price paid to farmers was low, given the value of the animals. This severity is undoubtedly linked to the repression of the Chouannerie. It led Breton farmers to prefer small horses, which were of no value to the army. From 1802 onwards, the Prefect of Brittany regularly reported that there were no good horses left, even though the region was ideal for breeding. From then on, requests to re-establish the stud farms poured in, notably from Saint-Pol-de-Léon, Moustoir-Ac, Pont-Scorff and Rochefort-en-Terre. On Ventôse 24, Year XII (March 14, 1804), the Morbihan Agricultural Society requested four stallions for the department, in view of the ruinous state of equine breeding.

=== 19th century ===
In 1831, 41,500 horses were registered in the Morbihan département alone.

==== Re-establishment of national stud farms and requisitions under the First Empire ====
Now hard to find, Brittany's horses had a good military reputation. They were mainly used to pull artillery. For this reason, Napoleon I commissioned his minister Chaptal to establish new national stud farms in Brittany, to supply his armies. Rather ignorant of horse breeding, Chaptal chose the Morbihan département. He chose two potential sites: Château de Crévy and Château de Josselin. During prairial year XII (May–June 1804), a survey identified four other sites on the lands of the Dukes of Rohan. On June 21, the sub-prefect of Pontivy proposed Langonnet. Thanks to its central location, the site was immediately selected. The stud farm was created in the Langonnet abbey. The setting was grandiose, and the sub-prefect of Pontivy demanded immediate work. The stud was to be populated with Norman, Navarrin, Barbet and Limousin horses, as well as the best double-bidets in Finistère. After a succession of complaints, Langonnet's manager was ousted in March 1810. In his three years of service, however, he had acquired many fine horses at fairs in Brittany and abroad. His successor encountered difficulties due to his isolation. The roads were unsafe, and it was not uncommon for commission agents en route to Langonnet to be attacked.

Between 1807 and 1814, 4,800 foals were born in the Breton departments, thanks to the stallions and mares of the national stud farm. Napoleon's administration also introduced incentives, distributed at the main fairs in Brittany. However, Brittany benefited little from these efforts, particularly from the good foal births in 1812. The horses needed by Napoleon's armies for the wars of the Empire were always requisitioned from local farmers, who actively resisted. The result was an "appalling degeneration in the size and strength of the mares": the forced requisitions took away all the mares capable of carrying a soldier, and farmers were only willing to use the "small, defective mares" they were sure to keep. The horses requisitioned in Brittany were appreciated by the armies for their stamina during the Russian campaign.

==== Changing needs ====
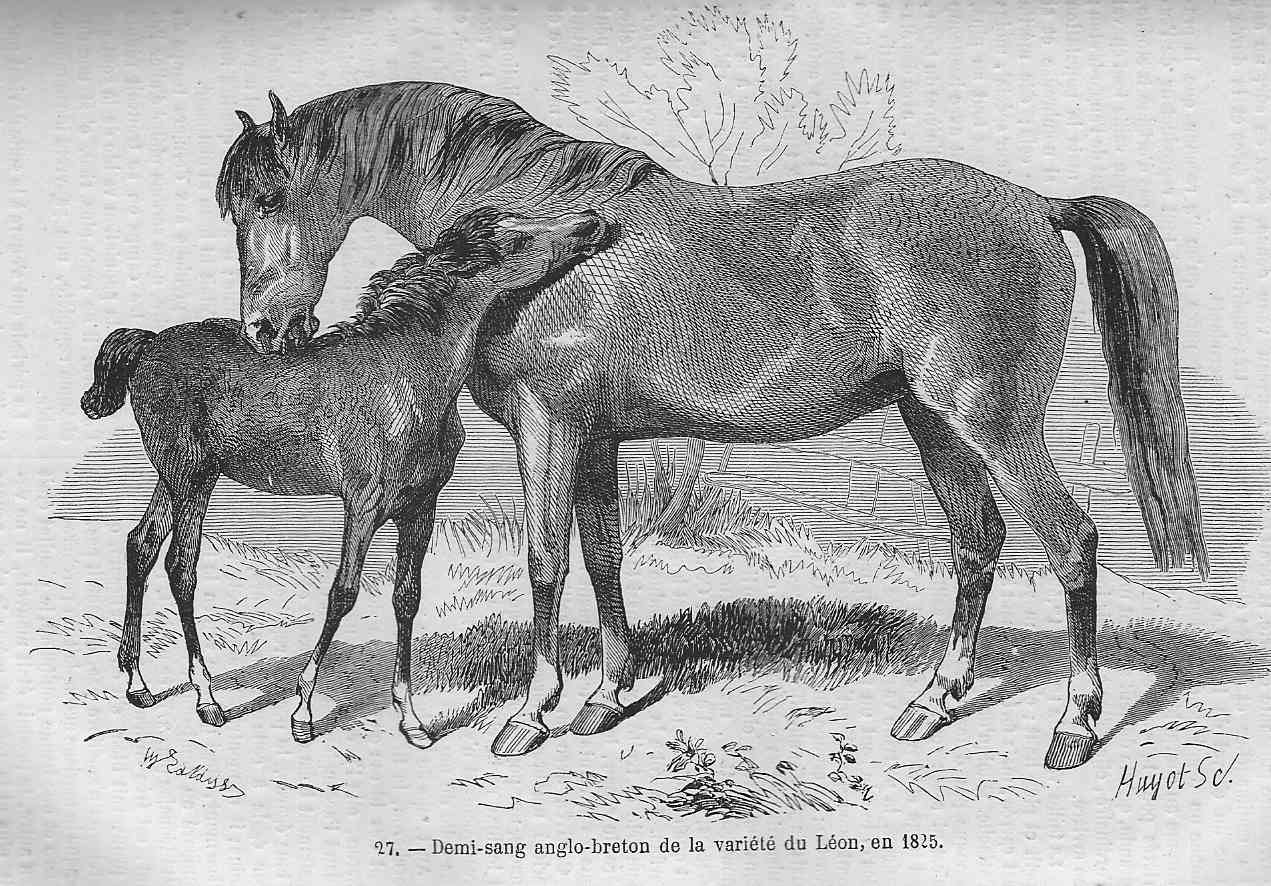
Anglo-Breton half-blood horse in Leon, 1825

Although unreliable, statistics compiled throughout the 19th century show a clear predominance of draft horse breeding. Developments in breeding methods probably led to better socialization of mares. Whereas they were left in a semi-feral state in the Léon region at the beginning of the previous century, their proximity to man coincided with the development of ploughing teams, to the detriment of oxen. According to Jacques Charpy, horse-drawn ploughing developed strongly between the French Revolution and the beginning of the 19th century.

In 1819, the director of the Haras National de Langonnet commented on his difficulties in finding good stallions in the region. Ephrem Houël ran the Langonnet stud from 1838 to 1847. In his Traité complet de l'élève du cheval en Bretagne (1842), he testifies to the central place this animal occupies in Breton life. Even the poorest peasants are obliged to own at least one horse. Farming, public carriages, road transport and city services are all carried out by local horses. Peasants go to pardons, christenings, funerals, pleasures and family affairs on horseback. According to Houël, riding is especially de rigueur at weddings. In the mountainous regions of inland Brittany, where roads are poor, the use of packhorses remains important. In the middle of the century, Jean-François Brousmiche testifies to the care these farmers lavished on their horses: it was not uncommon for them to be sheltered in the house in winter. They prepared the animals' feed "with as much or even more care than their own". Horse-drawn vehicle was often harsh. Some horses die between their harnesses. In the hills, stagecoach passengers dismount to relieve the animals. Animals pulling as far as Saint-Brieuc are sometimes "doped" with Calvados.

In the mountains of central France, racehorse breeding developed and reached its apogee with the birth of the leading stallion Corlay in the 1860s. The most remarkable trotter of his day, he was sired by Norfolk trotter Flying Cloud and a Thoroughbred steeplechase mare. However, breeding Thoroughbreds was not Brittany's vocation at the time. It developed gradually over the century, under the impetus of a few wealthy owners motivated by equestrian sport. The Anglo-Arabian was very much in evidence in these crossbreeds. In 1894, a Breton section was opened in the French half-blood studbook. In Loudéac, draft breeding predominated at the end of the century. Hygiene conditions were frequently blamed, in particular ammonia fumes in the stables, which were said to be the cause of periodic fluxion epidemics.

==== Action by the national stud farms ====
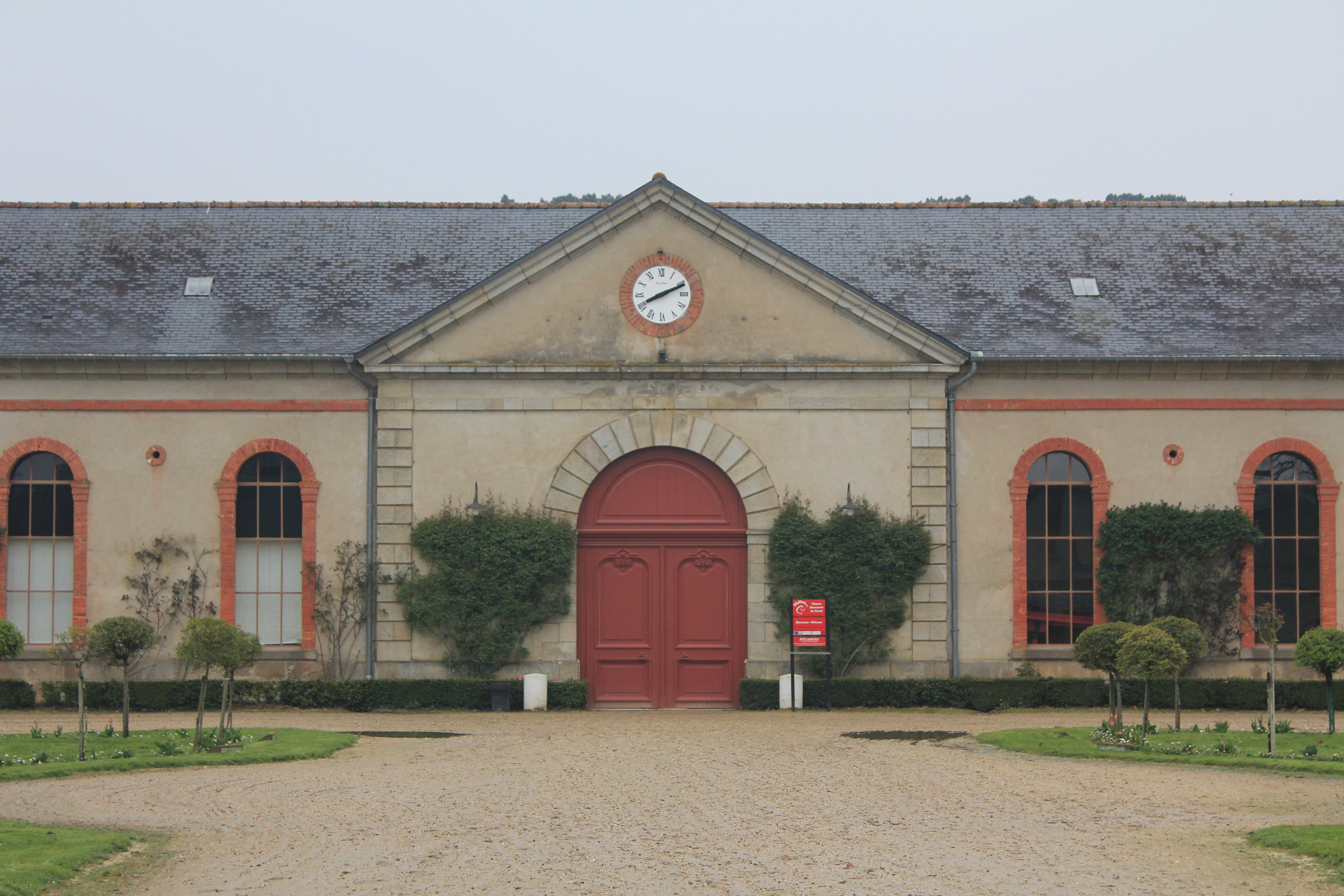
Entrance to the Haras National d'Hennebont, established in 1857

In 1817, as a result of Napoleon's seizures, the stallions stationed at Langonnet were on the whole very varied and of poor quality: "this is no longer a stud farm, but an acclimatization park for the world's equine fauna".

==== Establishment of new stud farms and remount depots ====
The creation of the Lamballe stallion depot was envisaged as early as 1807, but the necessary funds were not voted. The mayor of Lamballe again called for a stallion depot in 1818 and 1819. When the budget was deemed sufficient, the former Saint Martin barracks were converted into a stallion depot on January 16, 1825. In 1833, most of the stallions were sent to Langonnet, as the depot lacked the resources to operate properly.

Poorly served by narrow, impassable roads, the Langonnet stud was transferred in 1857 to Hennebont, in the grounds of the Abbey of La Joie. In 1827, a military remonte depot was established in Guingamp, with a branch in Morlaix. At first, it had great difficulty finding cavalry horses. In 1838, Saint-Pol-de-Léon became the site of a stud farm. A ranking of the French horses most resistant to military campaigns, carried out from 1845 to 1854, puts the remonte de Guingamp at the top. Horses in Brittany were also highly prized in the Crimean War. The officers in charge of recruiting artillery horses discriminated against light-gray coats and favored dark-coated animals, notably imposing crossbreeding with Norman half-bloods.

==== Against the breeding of bidets ====
The Haras Nationaux, the French authority on equine breeding, is constantly at odds with Breton breeders as they try to impose their own standard for lighter horses. According to Philippe Lacombe, their aim is to "nationalize and civilize the animal as well as man". In particular, the bidet is undergoing a veritable "stigmatization", and the men who breed it are under attack. For them, the bidet, decried for its lack of elegance, was the embodiment of peasant gaucherie, while the English thoroughbred was the object of immoderate infatuation.

In 1842, the director of the Langonnet stallion depot, Ephrem Houël, proposed the systematic slaughter of all horses under a certain size. This "solution" was not implemented, but the stud farms tried to impose crossbreeding with Anglo-Norman and Arabian horses to produce mounts suitable for cavalry service. The resulting foals, often ramshackle, were depreciated. The addition of Arab and Thoroughbred blood to the Breton breed from the central mountains, at the instigation of the national stud farms, led to the creation of the so-called "Corlay horse" type, to supply the army cavalry. Between 1844 and 1890, Brittany's stallion depots received 74 half-blood stallions for use in crossbreeding. According to Yann Brekilien, "the stud farms could not tolerate the existence of equines that did not conform to official standards, and began a merciless battle against the brave bidets. It didn't matter to them whether they were the best adapted to the needs of the locals, what mattered was standards". In his opinion, the National Stud's action against bidet breeding directly resulted in the disappearance of this little horse throughout Brittany. Draft horses bred in Léon and Trégor gradually replaced the traditional bidets throughout the century. These bidets were also crossed by their breeders with Ardennes stallions, for light draft work.

==== Trade ====
The wars at the beginning of the century and the high level of production meant that horses from Brittany were always exported. In 1842, according to Houël, "Brittany's particular breed of draft horse possesses qualities that make it sought-after throughout France and abroad, for road, stagecoach, postal and artillery train services". Nearly 30,000 foals are born each year. Half of them were sold to breeders in other regions (Normandy, Poitou, Perche, Auvergne, Maine). In 1850, almost 100,000 horses were registered in the Côtes-du-Nord department alone. In the second half of the 19th century, the breeding and export system became very efficient, thanks in particular to the railroads, which enabled these horses to be sent to distant destinations. From 1885 onwards, the United States began importing French draft horses on a massive scale, including Bretons. However, Breton draft horses are frequently confused with those from the Perche region. Before a sale, the animals are fed abundantly so as to look their best.

The construction of the railroads made Landivisiau the hub of the horse trade, to the detriment of the traditional fairs found throughout the region. Alongside Landivisiau, the three main horse fairs were held in Morlaix and Saint-Renan. Secondary fairs were held in Plouescat, La Martyre, Commana, Saint-Pol-de-Léon, Lesneven, Plouguerneau, Landerneau and Brest. The main trade in Léon and the Tréguier, Lannion, Bourbriac, Lamballe and Pontrieux regions is in horses. Foals are sold at 18 months and 2 years of age, and the mothers do the work on the farms: breeders in Finistère often recover these foals. The draft horse trade continued at the end of the century, while the half-blood horse trade kept pace with the progress of the railroads: despite the closure of post offices, horses were still needed for short distances, to take passengers to stations.

=== 20th and 21st centuries ===
The beginning of the 20th century was fatal for transport and luxury horses, which disappeared in favor of the automobile. In 1900, only nine people in the Côtes-du-Nord region owned a car, compared with 121 ten years later. Half-blood breeding collapsed in favor of Breton draft horses, which continued to sell well as long as horse-drawn agricultural work continued. Many jobs were linked to horse breeding, including "gelding" (the person in charge of castrating males), saddler and farrier. The various traditional countries share their breeding specialties. Western Leon keeps mostly mares, while males are bred further east. In the Pagan region, it is customary to sell the males at a very young age and keep only the fillies. In 1906, Finistère was the French department with the most horses, along with Mayenne. However, breeding does not make people rich, as a year without a foal birth is often financially dramatic. Inhabitants generally pay their rent by selling one of their horses.

==== Exports and trade ====
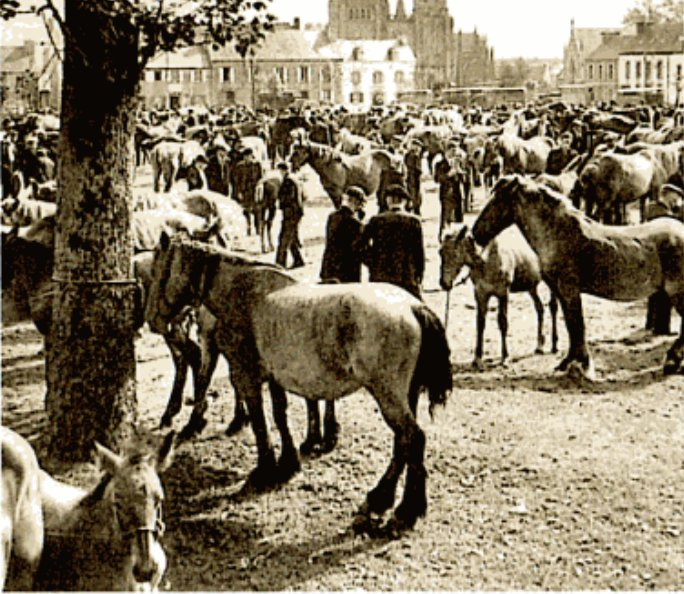
Horse fair in Finistère, in the 1900s

Before the 1900s, Brittany was still a relatively isolated "land of small-scale agriculture". But the region was well-suited to livestock breeding, and modernized transport benefited breeders who exported their animals all over Europe, boosting sales tenfold. The golden age of Breton horse breeding and trade was between 1900 and 1940. Trains full of horses left the Landivisiau station for all over France, and trains and boats took them to southern Europe (Italy and Spain), Germany, England, Switzerland, North Africa, South America and Japan. The German army acquired many Breton carriers. These "Malgré-nous" horses were used on the battlefields of the First World War, against France. In 1939 alone, 18,000 horses left Brittany. They were mainly trained work animals from Cornouaille and Vannes. In France, they were sent to the vineyards of Bordeaux and the Mediterranean, to farmers in the Vendée and Massif Central, and to the mines of the North.

Buyers were highly varied and hierarchical, from Parisian merchants to small-scale local "traffickers". The Parisian merchants, nicknamed "the French" because they didn't speak Breton, sent brokers supported by an interpreter who translated the buyer's wishes from French into Breton. The Foire Haute de Morlaix brings together 7,000 horses in September. All sales are conducted orally. If the animal has a hidden defect such as a tic à l'appui (tik-koad) or a tic à l'air (tik-aer), the sale may be cancelled or revised. Some unscrupulous dealers make up horses to increase their selling price: this may involve putting nitrate on a tooth to hide its worn state, putting a mustard poultice on the back to make it look less hollow, or hitting the legs with a boxwood hammer to make them look fuller. Some traffickers inflate the animal's rump with a bicycle pump and hypodermic needle, or introduce ginger or pepper into the anus to make them look more vigorous. There are also techniques for calming nervous horses by tying their tongues together for the duration of the sale, or for depreciating an animal by mixing finely chopped horsehair into its food, causing it to cough. These techniques are mainly used by Bretons with foreigners, not between people who know each other. As the century progressed, most horse fairs disappeared, due to the lack of use of horse-drawn vehicles. Only a few survived, such as the Kerien fair, which continued in 1986.

==== Care and training ====
Brittany horses put to work are often given supplementary feed based on gorse, beet, rutabaga and coarse bran, cut and pounded at night. Over time, this feed was replaced by ground cereals. To keep their livestock in good health, farmers went to horse pardons, or called on the services of healers and, later, veterinarians. The reputation of the rebouteux (an dresserien) often extended beyond the borders of his canton. The recipes for the ointments used are handed down from generation to generation.

Male animals are usually kept separate from females because of the supposed difficulty of getting them to work together. To accustom the animals to work, the eighteen-month-old horse is harnessed in line behind an older animal. Horses destined for work outside Brittany are often castrated after being sold, as the locals are used to working with whole horses. Landivisiau's geldings have a great reputation. They are said to be among the first to have discovered a technique for castrating horses without having to bed them. Two wooden pincers, the casseaux (ar gwaskelloù), are placed on the vessels irrigating the testicles. Within three weeks, the animal has lost its male instincts.

==== No longer used for work ====
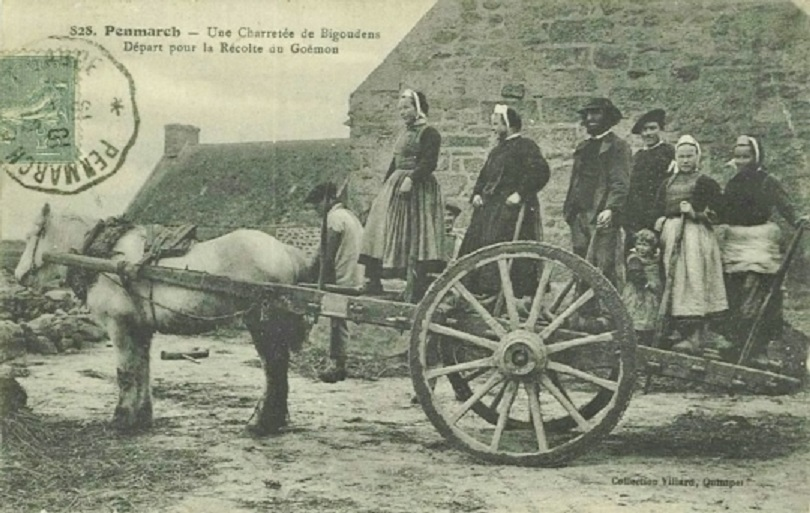
Bigouden farmers harvesting seaweed with their draft horse

In 1948, the Breton departments were among the richest in horses. There were 19 horses per square kilometer in Finistère, 13 in Côtes-du-Nord, 11 in Ille-et-Vilaine and 7 in Morbihan. One of Brittany's particularities is that it has maintained a high level of horse breeding later than other regions of France. Local markets are enough for breeders to survive. Until the 1960s, horses continued to be bred and exported in a way that was considered anachronistic. From the 1950s onwards, demand for horses declined sharply. Breeders in Brittany moved closer to their breeding syndicate and the national stud farms in the 1960s and 1970s, when motorized farming meant that only breeding premiums and agricultural competitions could sustain them. Breeding for the meat market gave a new lease of life to the Breton breed, particularly through exports to the Italian market. Conversion to meat production is difficult for some breeders and for the horses, which tend to become "fat" due to lack of work in the fields: breeding horses for meat is not part of Breton tradition. Vegetable farmers in the Pays de Léon are among the last to abandon horses for work. In 2012, there were only around 30 farms using horses for agricultural purposes. Breed shows are replacing the fairs of yesteryear, where horses are carefully groomed with raffia. The tradition of tail docking (caudectomy), to prevent the appendage getting caught in reins or harnesses, lives on. There is, however, at least one biennial ploughing competition in Finistère.

==== The leisure craze ====
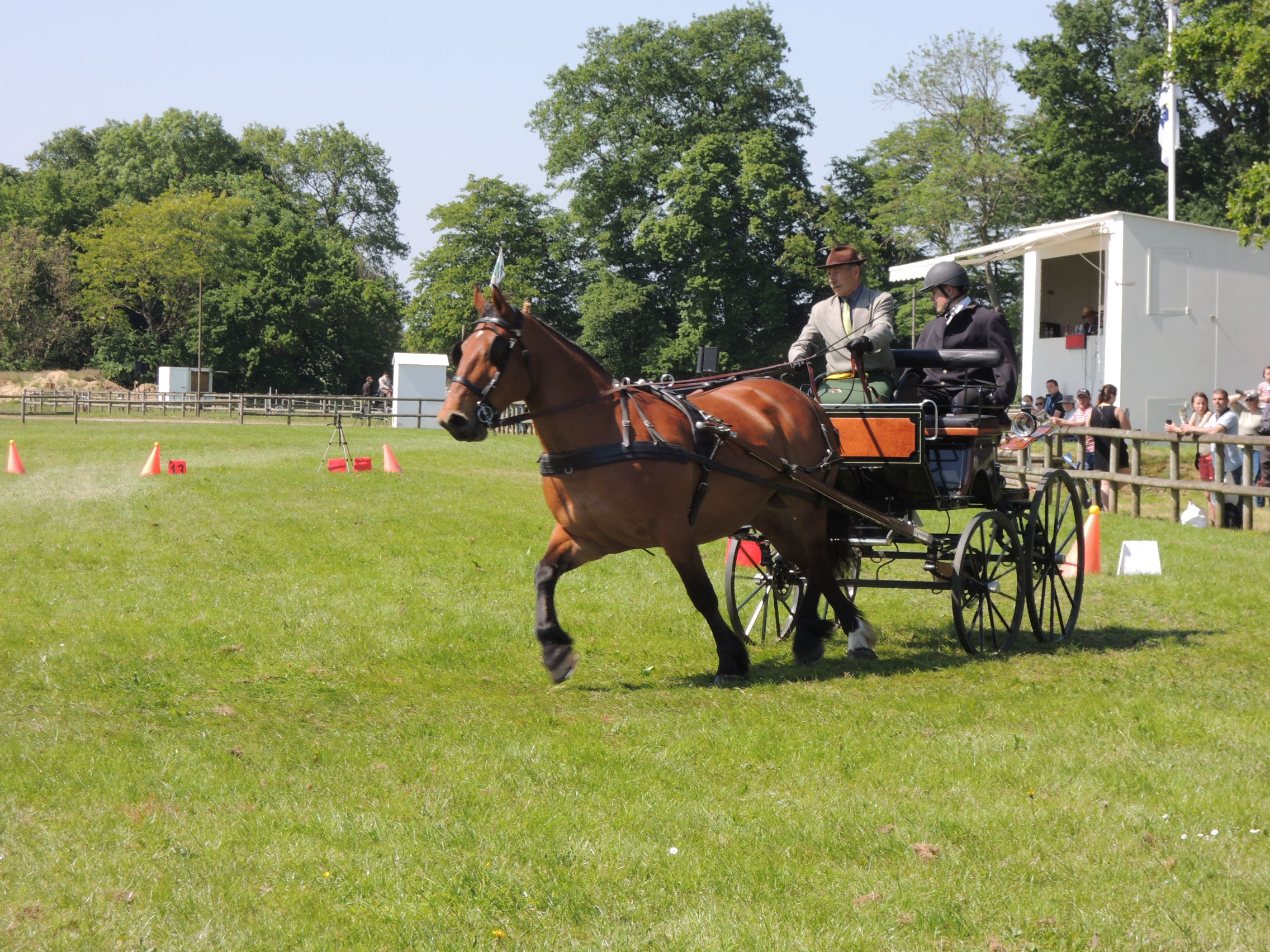
Driving competition at the Salon du Cheval de Travail, Rennes, 2014

In the 1990s, a wave of enthusiasm for the leisure horse accompanied the return to the land of neo-ruralists. This created a rift with traditional breeders. The 1996 ban on tail docking for draft horses was seen as heresy by some farmers. Driving for sport and leisure is gaining in importance. The Haras National d'Hennebont is transformed into a cultural center designed as an open-air museum. The Haras National de Lamballe became more involved, pursuing a policy of supporting leisure breeding, much to the chagrin of Breton beef horse breeders. A new generation of non-agricultural breeders is acquiring Breton horses with a view to conserving the breed and using them for leisure.

== Types of horses in Brittany ==
=== Historical breeds ===
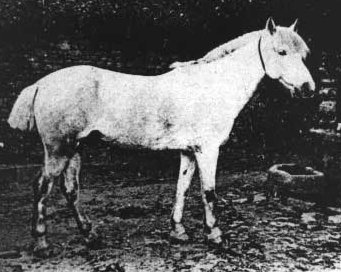
Marc'h Land, a 1.48 m (4 ft 10 in) truité gray Breton bidet, such as peasants used to ride before roads were improved

A very large number of different horses bear or have borne the name "Bretons", which explains why armies looking for lively saddle horses for officers and artillery horses to pull cannons could source them entirely from the fairs at Morlaix or La Martyre. The differences between types of horse are due to soil and feed: the northern coast generally produces abundant food, while the central mountains offer a difficult environment for breeding.

"After the introduction of horses to this region, those that bred on or near the Arée mountains remained slender and small rather than medium-sized; those that spread to the seashore, to the greasy, damp land, developed, took on large proportions and formed the light draft or coarse draft varieties [...] If Brittany had been all low and wet, or all mountainous and dry, we would find only one kind of horse: the diversity of the soil has created different breeds"

— Eugène Gayot

By default, the name "Breton horse" refers to the draft horse from the 19th century onwards. At the beginning of the 19th century, the "Léon breed", the "Conquet breed", the "Ouessant dwarf horses", the "Cornouaille bidets" and the "étique des monts d'Arrée breed" were listed as Breton horses. At the end of the 19th century, a distinction was essentially made between the draft horse ("Breton clean breed") and the bidet, without any confusion being possible between the two breeds. The bidet was transformed into a carriage horse by crossbreeding after road construction. The Corlay horse is a nineteenth-century creation, and the Centre-Montagne is a descendant of the mountain bidets, which had a short official existence from 1927 to the 1980s, essentially originating in inland Brittany. Léon is marked by the influence of foreign Norfolk breeding stock, while the Lamballe region is influenced by Percherons, and inland Brittany by Ardennais.

==== Léon ====
Around Saint-Pol-de-Léon and Morlaix, the strong-bodied Léon horse is bred. The climate, location and soil of Léon meant that the horse trade was the main source of income for its inhabitants in the mid-19th century, with each farm owning six to seven mares. The stallions used were supplied by the stud farm administration or were privately owned. Before the French Revolution, the stallions supplied by the States of Brittany were not draft horses, but during the organization of the Haras National de Langonnet, large draft Bretons, Percherons and Boulonnais were sent to Léon.

An 1859 review describes the "cheval de Léon" as measuring from 1.56 m to 1.64 m, with a coat that is generally bay, sometimes dappled gray and rarely chestnut. The head is square and a little heavy, the bridge of the nose straight or cambered, the gaskets pronounced, the neck thick and short, the mane often double, the withers slightly protruding and fleshy, the shoulders fleshy and slightly sloping, the rump rounded, broad, generally swallowed, hollowed out on the median line by a deep furrow, the tail set low and the manes long. The upper limbs are powerful, the hocks broad and lean, but the tendons are not very loose and the knee is a little effete. Like the tail, the fetlocks are furnished with long manes. The foot is large, splayed and flat. These horses are nevertheless full of energy and vivacity in their gaits, sober and very resistant to fatigue.

==== Conquet ====
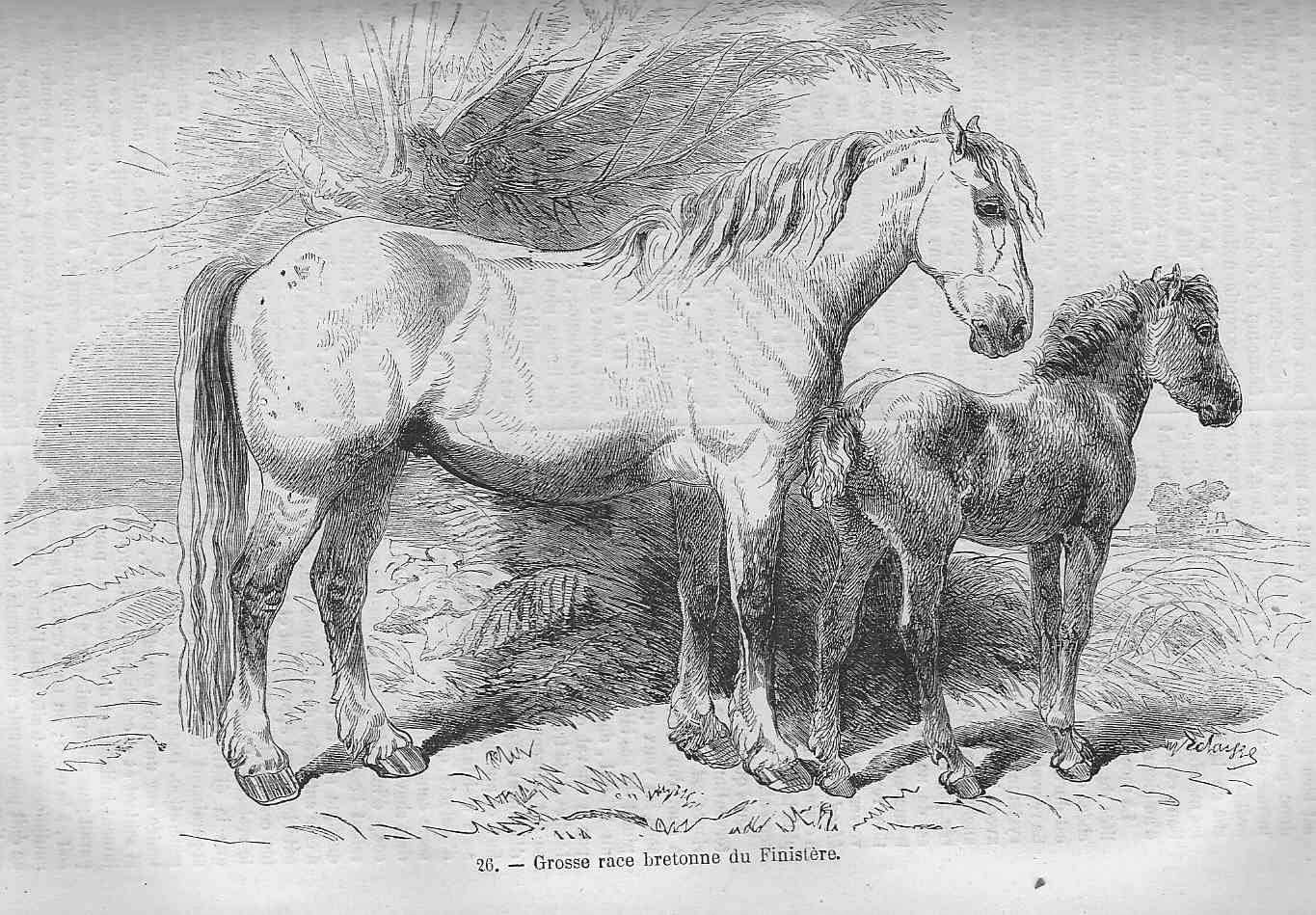
Cheval Breton du Finistère in L'Encyclopédie pratique de l'agriculteur, published by Firmin-Didot et Cie, volume 5, 1877

In the area around Saint-Renan, Trébabu and Le Conquet, light draft and carriage horses known as "Conquet horses" originate from the stud farms maintained in this region by wealthy owners, as well as the stallions placed there by the States of Brittany. Possibly descended from the Léon horse, they are lighter in shape and structure, due to less rich pastures than on the coast. They have been crossed with imported Danish, German and Norman horses. Bay-colored, sometimes dappled gray, their height varies from 1.48 m to 1.58 m. The square head is fairly light, the bridge of the nose straight and sometimes arched, the neck well proportioned, the withers quite high, the shoulders less loaded and a little more sloping than in the Leon horse, the body more elongated, the rump rounded and separated by a small furrow, the tail set higher, the limbs a little spindly compared to the other parts of the body, the fetlocks less covered with hair, the feet less splayed, less flat. This horse is energetic, sober and hard-working, but lacks distinction overall. An excellent weapon horse for line cavalry.

==== Bidet ====
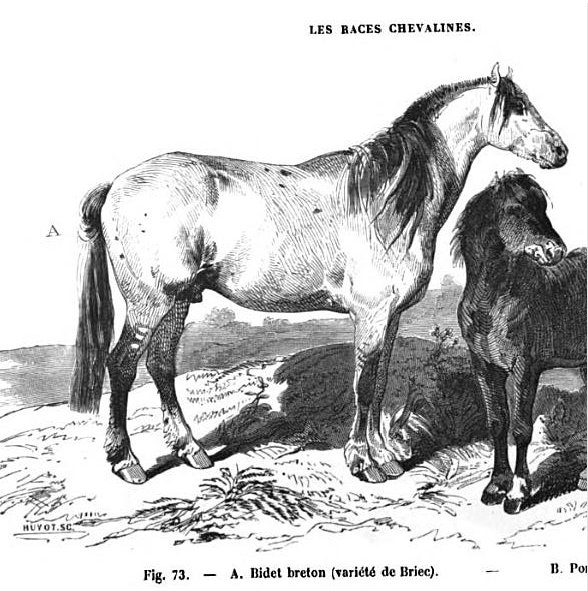
Bidet Breton de Briec, on an engraving from 1861

The Breton bidet has been much sought after for its amble. They can be found around Briec and Carhaix, in the valleys and on the sunset of the Monts d'Arrée, and on the Morbihan coast. These animals, generally bred by poor farmers, are not very homogeneous. Their coats are light, mostly chestnut, in various shades. Their size is small, and they are not very elegant, but very hardy. The Briec variety, known as the "Cornouaille bidet", enjoyed great popularity. At the beginning of the 19th century, the Breton bidet was "in France, the mount of almost all those whose profession requires them to ride daily". These bidets worked well into old age, making do with little food. From the 1850s onwards, the bidet became much less sought after as horse-drawn vehicles became more widespread.

==== Ushant dwarf horse ====
A handful of sources attest to the presence of "dwarf horses" on Ushant. "Highly sought-after and remarkable for their liveliness and elegance of form, no less than for the extreme smallness of their size", they were already in sharp decline by the time of Jean-Baptiste Ogée. In 1776, there were still 600 mares on the island. That same year, the inspector of the Bas-Léon stud farm asked for a dozen small Navarran stallions to improve the breed, leaving just one "old breed" Ouessant stallion. Around 1830, they were crossed with two Corsican stallions, close to their morphology. François-Marie Luzel saw Ouessant horses in his youth, but on another trip (as an adult) found that they had disappeared.

==== Horses from Saint-Brieuc, Tréguier and Lannion ====
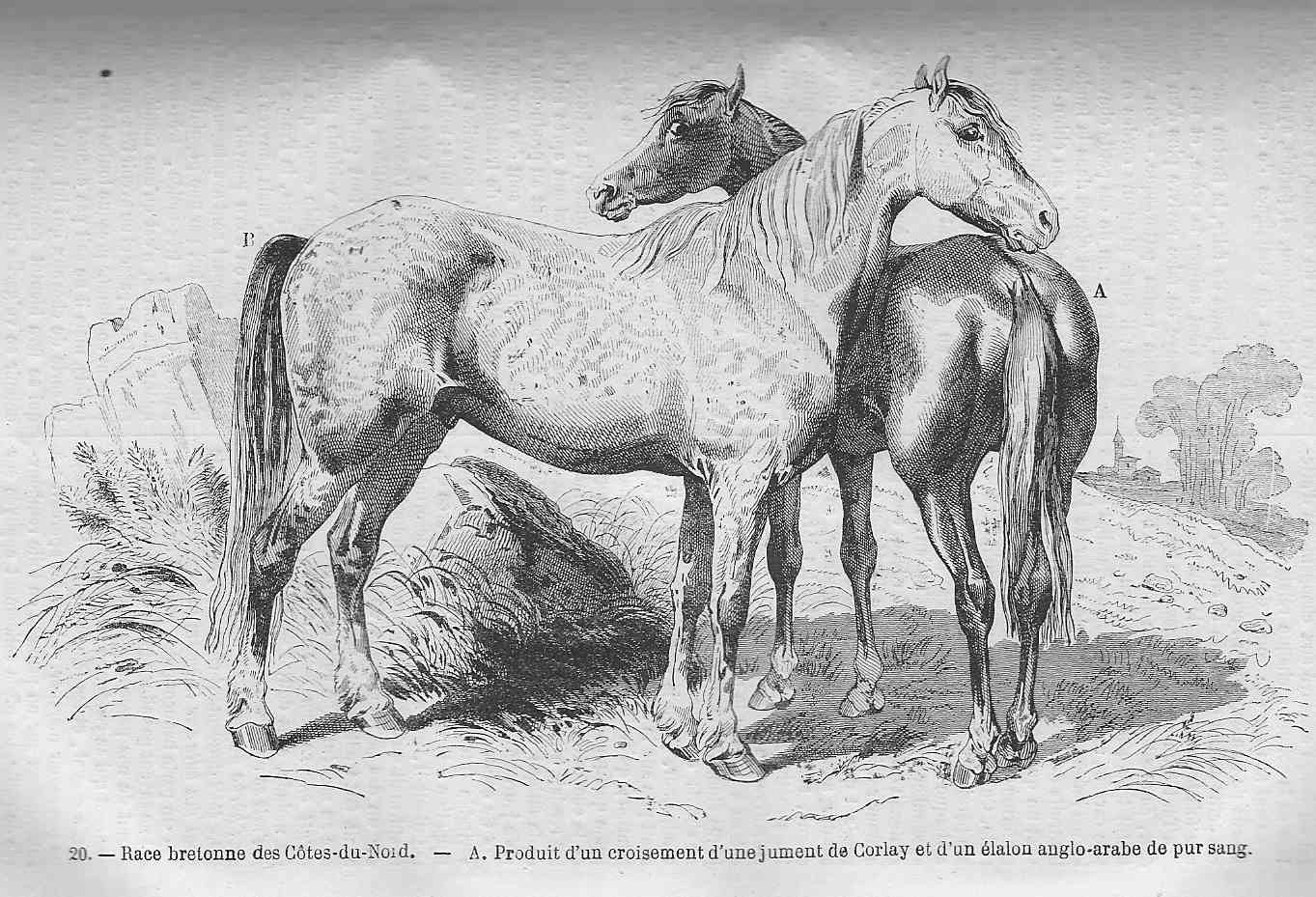
On the left, a Breton horse from Côtes-du-Nord, on the right, the Corlay horse

Other types of animal can be found in the Côtes-d'Armor region, particularly in Saint-Brieuc. Draft horses are similar to those of Léon, but their coats are speckled gray or truité, dappled gray and light gray, sometimes aubère or bay, and their height ranges from 1.48 m to 1.58 m. These horses can be found all along the coast, from Saint-Malo to Lannion, and are bought in foal by farmers around Dinan and Rennes, and even in Perche and Normandy. The horse bred in Tréguier can be divided into two varieties: one, stronger and more common than the Léon breed, is found mainly around Lannion; the other, much smaller, but well established and of fairly good conformation, is found around Pontrieux.

==== Corlay horse ====
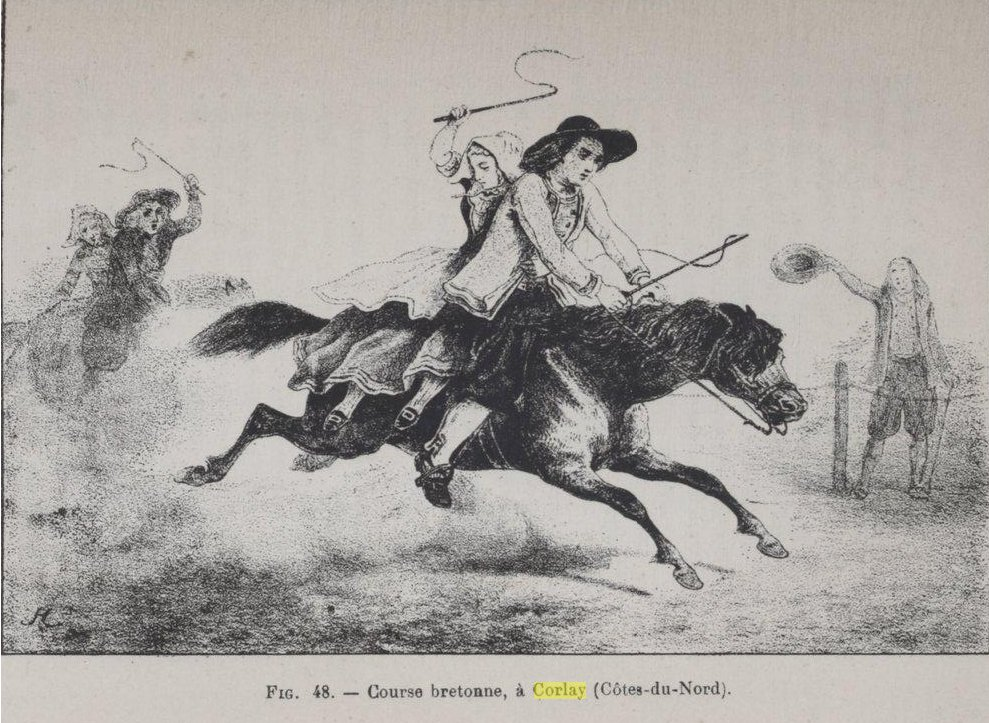
Horse race in Corlay, Côtes d'Armor

Also known as the "light mountain horse", its historic production center is located near Corlay. Before the Restoration, the region produced only sober bidets in a semi-feral state. In 1808, Arabian stallions and a few Thoroughbreds were introduced, resulting in the Corlay horse, which is raced locally thanks to the speed inherited from its ancestors. The breed was influenced by a stallion himself named Corlay.

Considered a national glory at the end of the 19th century, the Corlay horse is now referenced as an AQPS. measuring 1.50 to 1.55 m in height. Its numbers have declined steadily. By 1994, it had practically disappeared. The town of Corlay has opened a museum to trace its history.

=== Trait breton, Postier breton and Centre-montagne ===
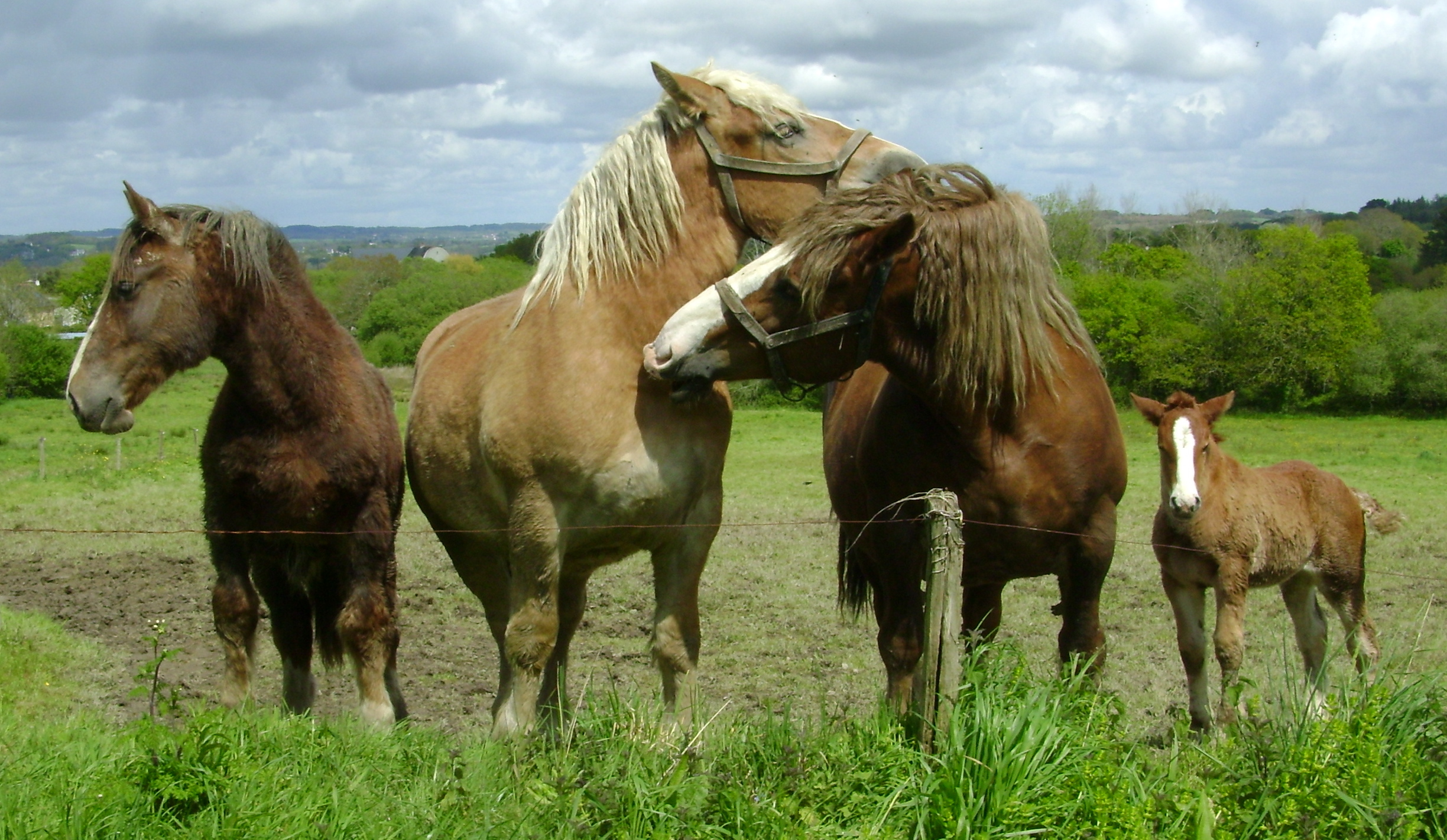
Breton in Daoulas, Finistère

Officially, only one breed of horse is recognized as being unique to Brittany. The Breton horse is divided into three types, two of which still exist today: the Centre-montagne or small draft Breton (now extinct), the Postier (lighter) and the Trait (heavier). The difference can be explained by their use: the Trait Breton was intended for heavy pulling at a walk (which requires horses to place their neck almost horizontally), and the Postier for pulling at a trot, which, on the contrary, requires the neck to be raised.

Originating in mountainous areas, the Centre-montagne is the smallest variety of the Breton breed. It was officially recognized in 1927 and descended from the bidets. It disappeared in the 1980s, due to its low meat yield. The Postier type is the "jewel of the breed", considered one of France's most precious zoological heritages. Its name derives from its historic use to pull post office wagons. It is the result of crosses between Léon mares and Norfolk and Hackney trotter stallions in the early 20th century. The Postier Breton made a name for itself in 1905 at the Concours Central Hippique de Paris. Lighter and broader in gait than the draft, measuring around 1.55 m, it is bred mainly in central Brittany. It is a good carriage horse for light draft work. The Trait is the result of crossbreeding with Ardennais and Percherons, notably the half-Ardennais Naous. The Breton Trait is very strong for its size, topping out at around 1.60 m. Now bred almost exclusively for meat, it is the breed's most common type, weighing up to a ton.

=== Foreign breeds ===
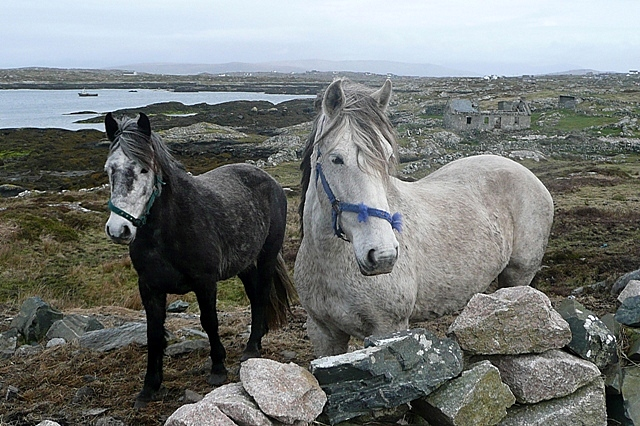
Polig was behind the introduction of Connemara ponies to Brittany in the 1970s.

In 1974, Polig Monjarret brought back three Connemara ponies from Ireland as part of his development of Interceltisme. Following the publication of an article in the magazine Paysan Breton and contact with the director of the Haras National de Lamballe, an import activity began, involving a total of around one hundred animals over several years. Brittany remains the leading breeding region for this breed in France.

It was also in the 1970s that Raymond Hascoët became interested in the Polish-bred Arabian horse, for breeding in endurance racing. He pioneered this type of breeding in the region. The region also boasts a large number of Dartmoor ponies, with the breed's French association based in Brech, Morbihan. Brittany is also France's leading Haflinger breeding region.

Brittany breeds a large number of AQPS and French Saddlebreds (the fourth-largest breeding region in France). The French Trotter and Thoroughbred breeds are on a par with the national average, but represent a significant volume, with around 750 and 350 breeding mares respectively. Although rarer in terms of numbers, the Barb, Highland pony and Fjord Pony breeds are also well represented.

== Economics and organization of horse-riding ==
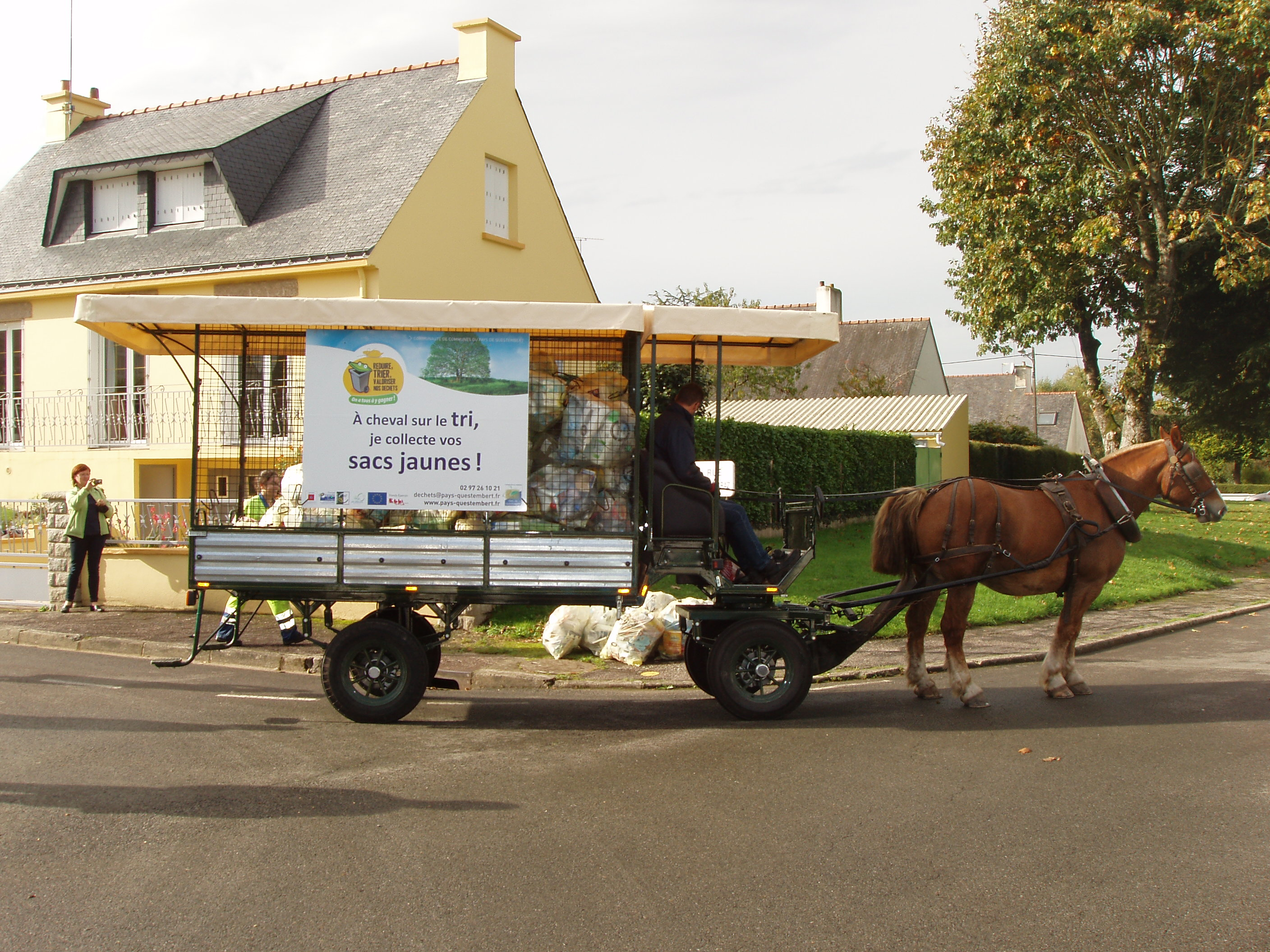
Horse-drawn waste collection in Questembert

Historically, the horse had a high economic value in Brittany, on the order of three to four times that of a cow. At the time, its use was essentially agricultural, with a secondary outlet in transport. Over time, with the end of horse-drawn vehicle, the economy of the sector changed. Brittany is clearly developing equestrian tourism. The region also retains a strong tradition of equestrian sport (trotting, show jumping and galloping). It is highly competitive in equestrian endurance, both for breeding horses and for riders. It also boasts national-level victories in show jumping and driving. Some 4,800 jobs depend directly on the equestrian sector, with annual sales of 201,400,000 euros (2011 figures for administrative Brittany). In the same year, there were 26,040 equidae in the region. In October 2011, Brittany's General Council unanimously adopted a "horse plan" in support of the industry.

Various organizations manage aspects of breeding. The Conseil des Equidés de Bretagne deals with all sectors, while the Fédération régionale des associations d'éleveurs de chevaux de sport en Bretagne (FEDEB), as its name suggests, specializes with sport horse breeders in the three Olympic disciplines of show jumping, eventing and dressage. The Association du Cheval Arabe Bretagne Endurance (ACABE) federates endurance horse breeders and breeders of the thoroughbred Arabian horse for all uses. The Fédération bretonne des éleveurs et utilisateurs de poneys (FBEUP) deals with ponies. There are also a number of national and regional breeding organizations active in a wider area, but particularly active in Brittany. The Association des éleveurs de chevaux de l'Ouest (ASSELCO) and the Association des éleveurs d'AQPS are well represented, given the large number of equestrian sport breeders in Brittany. The Syndicat des éleveurs du cheval breton, given the breed's historical origins, is also very much involved in Brittany.

=== Breeding ===
Brittany has a strong breeding economy, although the average age of the profession is high, at around 55. Unsurprisingly, the Breton horse is the predominant breed on these farms, accounting for 38% of the herd, or more than 2,000 breeding mares in 2011. There are departmental differences, with draft horses more prevalent in Côtes d'Armor, while Ille-et-Vilaine has more trotter farms. The breeding sector reported 4,058 births in 2011, representing total sales of €46,876,779 in the same year.

=== National stud farms and equestrian centers ===
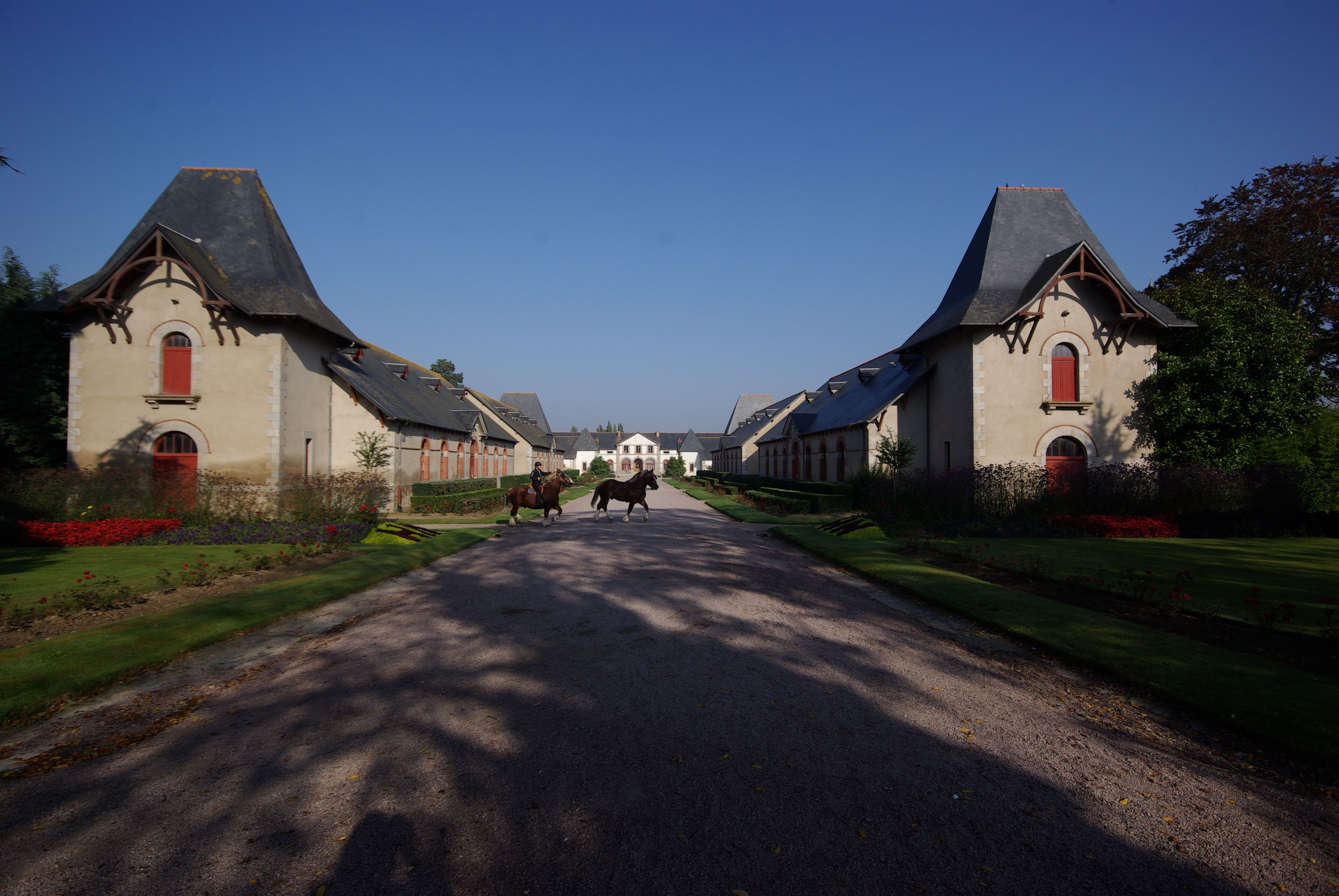
West entrance to the Haras National de Lamballe

Brittany is home to five regional equestrian centers, which host numerous sporting and cultural events. They are financed by the Spur Fund and the Regional Council of Brittany. The Haras National de Lamballe (Côtes-d'Armor), historically created to serve the north of Brittany, is the cradle of Breton Postier breeding and a tourist site, managed by a mixed syndicate since 2006. It welcomes 50,000 visitors and spectators every year. The équipôle de Corlay, in Corlay (Côtes-d'Armor), was originally a simple racecourse created in 1905 and modified by the addition of infrastructures. It is used for racing-type equestrian activities, as well as endurance, eventing and driving events. Eventually, the town of Corlay aims to become Brittany's regional endurance center, as well as a training and development center for this discipline.

The équipôle de Landivisiau (Finistère) has been in existence since January 21, 2012, and welcomes around 260 horses every month, in all equestrian disciplines and all year round. It includes training facilities for trotting and galloping races, three riding arenas including one for show jumping, and a cross-country course. The Haras National d'Hennebont (Morbihan) was historically the stud serving the south of France. Specializing in Breton horses and carriage driving, it opened an "Espace Découverte du Cheval en Bretagne" in 1999. Around 30,000 visitors attend its shows and visit its museum every year, including 15,000 for events. In summer, it becomes a national stage for horse shows. Since 2007, the site has been managed by a mixed syndicate. The Val Porée equestrian stadium in Dinard (Ille-et-Vilaine), Brittany's fifth-largest equestrian center, is considered one of the five finest showgrounds in Europe. It hosts major competitions, particularly in show jumping.

In addition to the five équipôles, Breton horses can be seen at the Rennes Ecomuseum and at the Maison du Cheval Breton on the Ménez-Meur estate in the Monts d'Arrée.

=== Racecourses ===
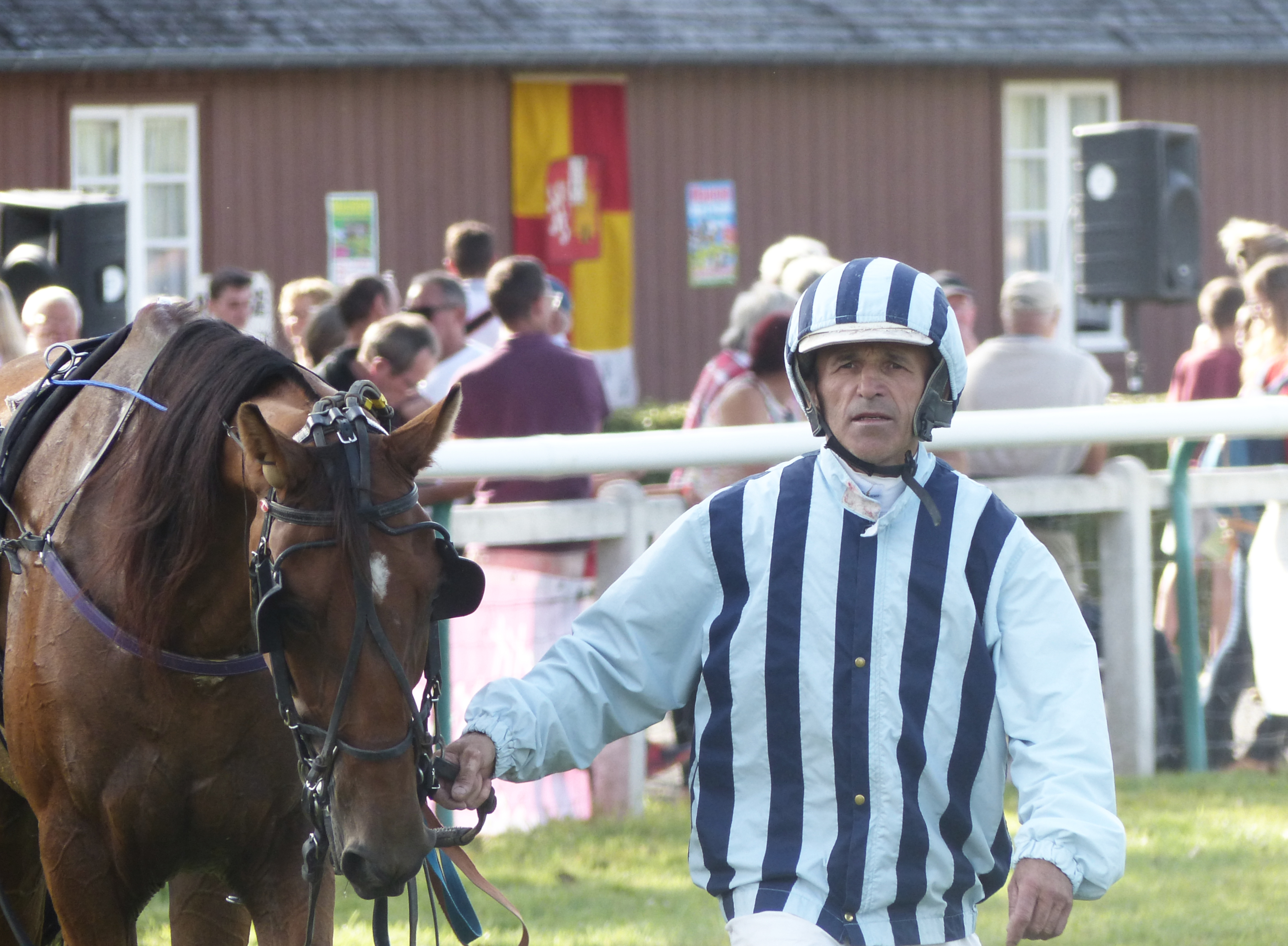
Driver and trotter at Saint-Jean-des-Prés racecourse in Guillac, near Josselin

Brittany also boasts a large number of racecourses, unevenly distributed across the region. Twenty-nine racing companies manage Brittany's racecourses. The most active are Saint-Brieuc (Hippodrome de la Baie), Saint-Malo (Hippodrome de Marville) and Maure-de-Bretagne (Hippodrome des Bruyères), which organize ten meetings a year.

=== Events ===
Numerous equestrian events are organized throughout the year. Since 2009, the Landivisiau region has been offering the "Month of the Horse" in May, with numerous events and demonstrations. In Loudéac, the "Fête du Cheval" is an opportunity to see all types of Breton horses, with a view to promoting the region's culture: on the second Sunday in August, around 220 horses and 30 horse-drawn carriages are on show. There has also been a horse festival in Guer since 1991, combining horses, music and traditions, notably the Welsh language. In Landerneau, the horse festival organized since 1988 combines a parade of horse-drawn vehicles with traditional music. This is the revival of an earlier festival, organized in 1948 by photographer Yan de la Fosse-David in aid of Breton horse breeding. It attracted over 25,000 people to the Kerbrat stadium.

Brittany's horses are also present at the SPACE international animal production show in Rennes, and at the Morlaix horse show, which attracted over 8,000 visitors in 2013.

== Culture ==
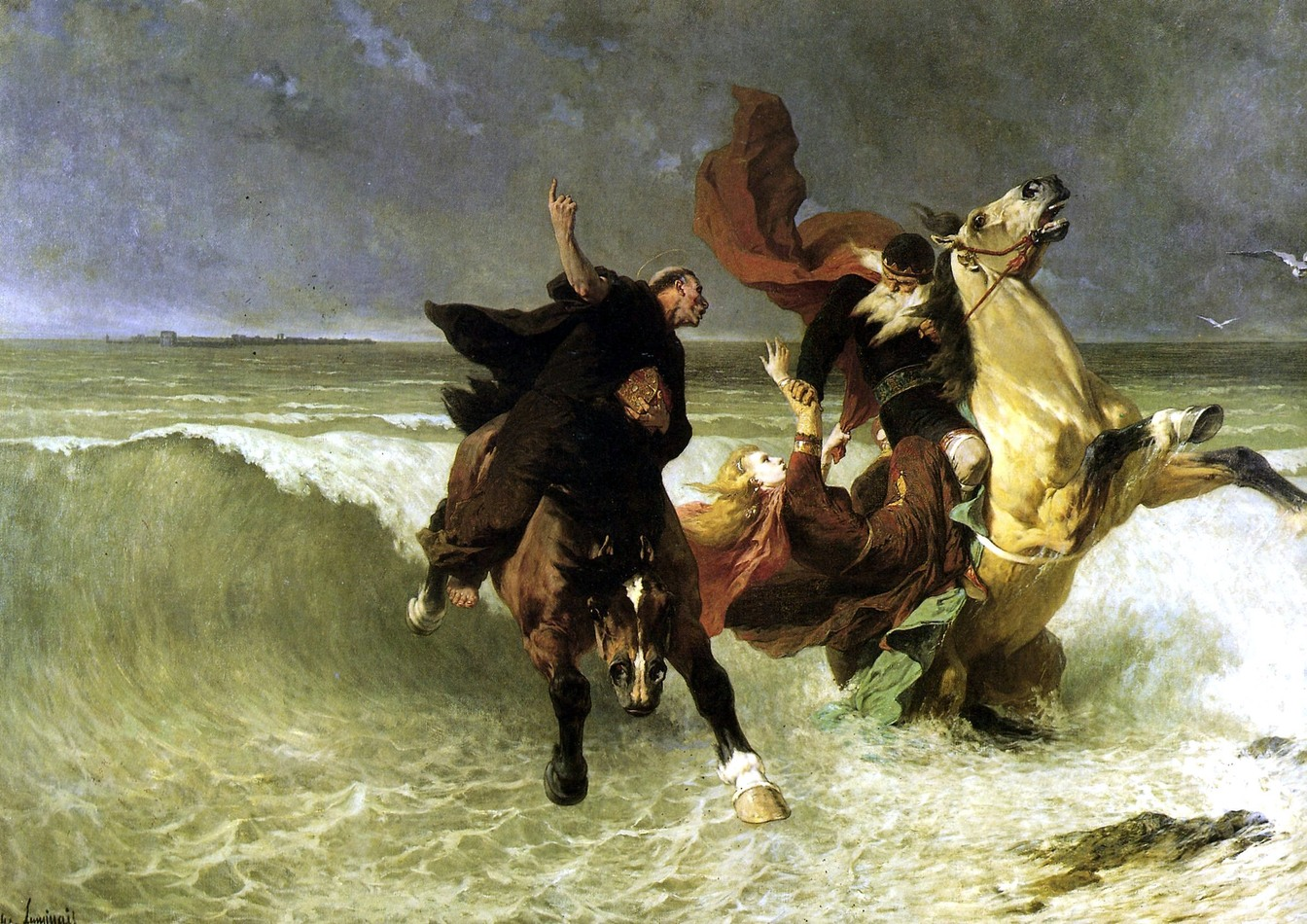
La fuite du roi Gradlon, by Évariste-Vital Luminais, circa 1884, Musée des beaux-arts de Quimper. The horse on the right is supposed to be Morvarc'h.

Horses enjoy a special cultural status in Brittany, thanks to their attachment to the animal. A work tool and an object of pride, the horse is associated with all the events of life, including pardons. The European tourist market has led to a "folklorization" of these traditions. Tales and songs often evoke the horse, generally linked to the element of water and particularly to the waves of the sea. The animal also represents the Devil and death (the Ankou). In fairy tales, the horse generally plays the role of a hero's magical protector.

Morvarc'h (the sea horse) and King Marc'h (the horse-eared king) are present in Breton traditions. Attestations of the Mallet horse legend exist in Loire-Atlantique. Breton and Gallo include equestrian vocabulary, with numerous dialects. Toponyms are composed from the words marc'h (horse in Breton) and cabal (horse in Latin), particularly in Cornouaille. Among the armorial bearings of the various communes, the horse and equestrian elements are especially present in Basse-Bretagne, corresponding to the department of Finistère. In 1975, Pierre-Jakez Hélias published Le Cheval d'orgueil, a largely autobiographical book, which was a great success and led to a controversy with Xavier Grall, who replied to the author in Le Cheval couché in 1977. Le Cheval d'orgueil was made into a film in 1980 by director Claude Chabrol.

== See also ==
- Equestrianism in Brittany
- Breton horse
- Breton bidet
- Horses in Normandy
- Horses in Breton culture

== Bibliography ==
- Colombel, Jean-Maurice; Simon, François (2003). Des chevaux et des hommes Bretons (in French). Éditions La Part Commune. ISBN 9782844180506.
- Jamaux-Gohier, Théotiste (2001). La poste aux chevaux en Bretagne (in French). Éd. régionales de l'Ouest. ISBN 9782855541020.
- Mavré, Marcel (2004). Attelages et attelées : un siècle d'utilisation du cheval de trait (in French). France Agricole Éditions. ISBN 9782855571157.
- "Du cheval en Bretagne au cheval Breton". Kreiz Breizh (in French). Mémoires et actualité du Centre Ouest Bretagne Carhaix-Plouguer. 2002.
  - Le Gall, Myriam. "Cheval de guerre". In Kreiz Breizh (2002), pp. 13–20.
- de Sallier-Dupin, Guy (1998). Le cheval chez les Bretons des Côtes-d'Armor : De l'Ancien régime à la Grande Guerre (in French). Coop Breizh.
- Hervé, Patrick (1999). Chevaux de Bretagne. Petits cahiers bleus (in French) (4th ed.). Skol Vreizh. ISBN 2-911447-31-X.
- Hervé, Patrick (1989). Des chevaux de Bretagne (in French).
- Houël, Éphrem (1842). Traité complet de l'élève du cheval en Bretagne (in French). E. Tostain.
- Moll, Louis; Gayot, Eugène (1861). La connaissance générale du cheval: études de zootechnie pratique, avec un atlas de 160 pages et de 103 figures (in French). Didot.
- de Verchère, Louis (1890). Essais sur l'élevage du cheval en Bretagne (in French). A. Le Roy.
- Cornic, Martial. Le cheval en Bretagne, Landerneau (in French). Rennes: Desmoulins.
- Gast, A. (1907). Essai sur la Bretagne hippique : le postier breton, le cheval de trait, le cheval de sang (in French). Paris: C. Amat.
- Saint-Gal de Pons, Antoine-Auguste (1931). Origines du cheval breton. Le Haras de Langonnet. Les Dépôts de Lamballe et d'Hennebont. Le dépôt de remonte de Guingamp (in French). Celjoarion.

=== Academic sources ===
- Boekhoorn, Nikolai (2008). Bestiaire mythique, légendaire et merveilleux dans la tradition celtique : de la littérature orale à la littérature écrite : Thèse de Breton et celtique sous la direction de Gwendal Denis et Pádraig Ó Riain (PDF) (in French). Université Rennes 2 Haute Bretagne and University college Cork.
- Charpy, Jacques (1961). "Les chevaux bretons au xviiie siècle". Norois (in French). 38 (1). Bulletin de la société archéologique du Finistère: 187–188.
- Charpy, Jacques (1963). "Les haras de Bretagne sous l'Ancien Régime (1666–1790)". Norois (in French). 42 (1). Mémoires de la Société d'histoire et d'archéologie de Bretagne: 226.
- Corre, Joelle (1993). Landivisiau, capitale du cheval Breton au xxe siècle (in French). Mémoire d'histoire contemporaine – université de Bretagne occidentale.
- Houdus, J. (1941). L'Élevage du cheval en Bretagne... : Thèse de méd. vétérinaire (in French). Impr. réunies.
- Lizet, Bernadette (2003). "Mastodonte et fil d'acier. L'épopée du cheval breton". La Ricerca Folklorica (in French). Retoriche dell'animalità. Rhétoriques de l'animalité (48). La ricerca folklorica Retoriche dell'animalità. Rhétoriques de l'animalité: 53. doi:10.2307/1480074. JSTOR 1480074.
- Le Berre, Yvon (1982). Les grandes étapes de la création du cheval Breton (in French). Ethnozootechnie.
- Le Berre, Yvon (2013). "Chevaux". Dictionnaire du patrimoine breton (in French) (2nd ed.). Presses universitaires de Rennes. ISBN 978-2-7535-2778-2.
- Mulliez, Jacques (1999). "Essai sur le rapport éventuel entre « révolution agricole » et utilisation du cheval de labour". Annales de Bretagne et des pays de l'Ouest (in French). 106: 87–99. doi:10.3406/abpo.1999.4016.
- Roche, Daniel (2008). La culture équestre de l'Occident xvie-xixe : L'ombre du cheval (in French). Essai sur l'utilité équestre.
