= Bidet horse =

Extinct breed of horse

Bidet
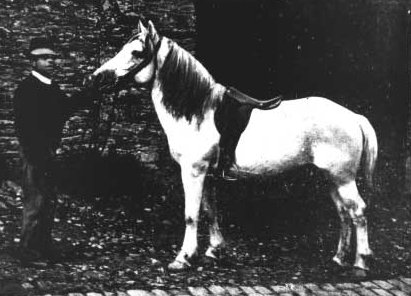
- Conservation status: Extinct
- Country of origin: France

Traits
- Height: 110–135 centimetres at the withers

The Bidet was a type of small horse from France, now extinct. It was a landrace developed principally in the area around Brittany, Morvan, Auvergne, Poitou, and Burgundy. It stood about 110–135 centimetres at the withers. Two distinct groups are documented, which were bred in a semi-feral state.

Bidets were first identified in the 15th century. They were used as "jack-of-all-trades" animals, equally suited for riding, farm work and passenger transport. They declined during the 19th century, when railways and better-kept roads pressured horse breeders into specialising their breeds. Despite the animal's disappearance, the name "bidet" survives in several French cultural references.

== Etymology and terminology ==
The term "bidet" first appeared in 1564, used by François Rabelais to describe a small horse. He probably borrowed the word from the Old French "bider", meaning "to trot", itself derived from "rabider", meaning "to run in haste", which was used in the 14th century. According to the Trésor de la langue française, a bidet horse is a "small post horse, stocky and vigorous, ridden by couriers; a small saddle horse or draft horse." The usage of the feminine form "bidette" can also be found in one of Gustave Flaubert's works.

The word "bidet" came to refer to a small saddle horse of the people, of a "genre peu élevé" ("a lowly kind"); thus, this term also came to have a pejorative connotation. Some tillers during the mid-20th century still referred to their workhorses as bidets, but usage of the term has significantly decreased, with "poney" replacing it as the common word.

The plumbing fixture known as the bidet has been referred to by this name since 1739, coming from a metaphor that most likely refers to the straddling position that one must assume while using the bidet.

== History ==
The history of the bidet is associated with the history of commoners and the state. These horses were only valuable for the work they were able to carry out at a low cost. Therefore, the beauty, size, coat color, and sex of the horse were of no importance; only working ability and hardiness were taken into account. The breeding of this type of horse was carried out against the recommendations of the Haras Nationaux (national stud farms), who, in hoping for their eradication, criticized them as "little ugly horses." They were generally raised semi-wild without any true selection process. During antiquity, Brittany and Normandy had small horses, possibly introduced by the Celts during their migrations to Asia. During the 16th century, Normandy was known to have sturdy and heavy bidets, capable of pulling over long distances and serving as stagecoach or artillery horses.

=== 17th and 18th centuries ===
During the 17th century, most of the existing bidet horses were located in Brittany. In the following century, they could also be found in Auvergne, Poitou, Morvan, and Burgundy. The regions of Morvan and Auvergne (with Vivarais and Limousin) raised saddle bidets. This type of breeding flourished until the end of the 18th century, when bidets were in high demand by the belligerents of the French Revolution and thus frequently requisitioned by military forces. They were actively sought after by merchants, who sometimes traveled dozens of kilometers to various villages to buy and resell them.

=== Disappearance ===
Several hippologists, among them Jacques Mulliez, observe the disappearance of the bidet as having occurred from the 19th century up until the beginning of the 20th century. According to Bernadette Lizet, this type of breeding was abandoned due to a multitude of factors, including improvements in roads (allowing the passage of horse-drawn vehicles), the modernization of agriculture, the digging of canals, and the arrival of the railroad. The bidet's disappearance began in the "breeding countries" where one could find mares, as those fit for the saddle were eliminated in favor of those stronger and bigger horses that were better suited for pulling. The introduction of draft mares in the Bazois region, as documented by surviving sales records, was to the detriment of the cheaper bidets, who were less efficient in pulling. The bidets of Morvan, crossbred with stallions and draft mares, would disappear completely during the second half of the 19th century. In Brenne, the "brennou" pony, a variety of bidet, disappeared with the draining of the region's marshes. Another type of bidet that inhabited the moors and woods near Derval and Blain also disappeared.

During the 1850s, the Breton bidet became much less sought after, at least in the regions of Cornouaille and Morbihan. Around 1859, it was only still used in its place of origin, despite its hardiness and reliability. It was replaced by other Breton draft horses from Léon and Trégor. Small saddle horses, like the Norman merchant's bidet, were derided by many, who were instead in favor of carriage breeds. By the beginning of the 20th century, Breton bidets were "nothing more than a memory." The disappearance was not only physical, for Daniel Roche and Daniel Reytier have also noted a change in the common vocabulary; the word "bidet" was gradually substituted by "poney" (pony), a term imported from English speaking countries during the 1820s and 1830s.

=== Legacy ===
Some "bidets" were mentioned in the 20th century, more as a designation for small working horses than as a specific type or breed. During World War I, Germans reportedly brought "bidets" to the Boulonnais region. A commander from Rancourt advocated using the "Sancerre bidet" to counter Nazi Germany in 1939.

Today, all French bidets have disappeared without directly giving rise to new breeds, though they influenced some. The Centre-Montagne, also known as the "small Breton draft," originates from Brittany's mountainous areas where bidets were bred. Recognized as a type of the Breton breed in 1927, alongside the draft and postier types, it stands around 1.40 m (4 ft 7 in). It likely descends from mountain bidets and survived "because there were always breeders who rode horses in the mountains."

== Description ==
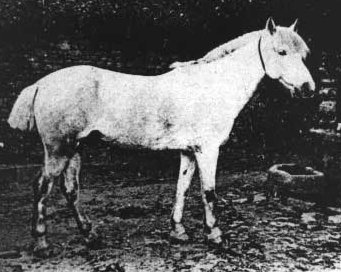
Marc'h Land, a grey spotted Breton bidet standing 1.48 m (4 ft 10 in), ridden by farmers before road improvements.

Bidets do not constitute a single breed, except for those recognized in Brittany and the Morvan. Describing them is challenging, as they were "road horses," intermediate between saddle horses and draft horses. In the 18th century, their height likely ranged from 1.10 to 1.35 m (3 ft 7 in to 4 ft 5 in), equivalent to a pony. Several types of bidets were historically distinguished. In the French army, the companion bidet served as a pack horse. The post bidet was used by couriers, described in the Encyclopédie as "a small post horse ridden, not harnessed to a post chaise." The double-bidet was described as larger and stronger than ordinary bidets, and pacing bidets, per the Trésor de la langue française, were horses that, in the elevated walk, lift their feet as little as possible, a condition for speed. They were primarily from Normandy, where, until the early 19th century, semi-feral animals were raised economically yet strong enough to plough.

=== Breton Bidets ===
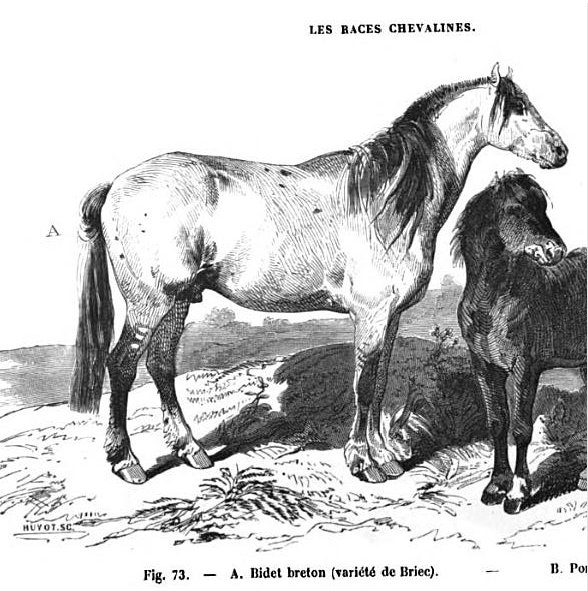
Breton bidet from Briec, from an 1861 engraving.

According to Mikael Bodlore-Penlaez and Divi Kervella, four types of Breton bidets, all extinct by the 1850s, existed: the Briec bidet (Kezeg Kernev bidochenn, in Cornouaille), the mountain bidet (Kezeg-menez, in the eastern Monts d'Arrée), the moorland bidet (Kezeg-lann, near Loudéac by Rennes), and the Ouessant bidet (Kezeg bihan Eusa). Breton bidets (and "double-bidets") were historically valued for their natural or trained amble. They were found around Briec, Carhaix, the valleys and western slopes of the Monts d'Arrée, and the Morbihan coast. These horses were heterogeneous, typically raised by poor farmers. Mid-19th-century descriptions note their predominantly chestnut coats in various shades, with heights from 1.38 to 1.40 m (4 ft 6 in to 4 ft 7 in). They had square, slightly heavy, snub-nosed heads; lively eyes; straight, slender necks; low withers; lean shoulders; rounded, short, compact bodies; low, rounded hindquarters; strong limbs; broad, well-defined hocks (sometimes close); hairy fetlocks without long hair; and well-formed feet. Carhaix bidets were more angular and slightly taller than those from Briec and Châteauneuf-du-Faou. The Briec variety, or "Cornouaille bidet," was highly popular. Trotting bidets had long, lively strides, worked into old age without limb issues, and required little food. Their frugality earned them the nickname "Cossack of France" during the Russian campaign.

In Loire-Atlantique, a moorland and woodland bidet, described at the end of the Ancien Régime as barely exceeding 1.20 m (3 ft 11 in), lived near Derval and Blain. It was renowned for astonishing vigor, frugality, and robustness.

=== Morvan Bidet ===
The Morvan bidet, specific to the Morvan region, was known for its hardiness and frugality. Paul Diffloth praised its ability to trot at 12 km/h (7.5 mph) on rough paths. Maturing late, it was suitable for work after age seven. Compact like the Breton bidet, it was slightly more refined, likely resembling a pony in appearance with a wild look, light yet robust. Its lifestyle suited the harsh Morvan environment, as these horses were secondary to more profitable cattle, feeding on their leftovers.

== Uses ==
In the 17th century, bidets were used to transport farm produce, wood, and manure. They were primarily employed for work, both in pulling and carrying people or materials. In the early 19th century, the Breton bidet was "in France, the mount of nearly all those whose profession required daily riding." According to Éphrem Houël, train bidets could cover 30 to 40 kilometers at a supposed "24 kilometers per hour," which seems exaggerated. From 1806, local races were held in departments like Orne, Corrèze, and Morbihan. While Parisian races featured only Thoroughbreds, bidets competed in provincial races, particularly in Brittany and Lower Normandy. Their use in plowing was rare and typically involved mixed teams with oxen, with the bidet leading.

== In popular culture ==
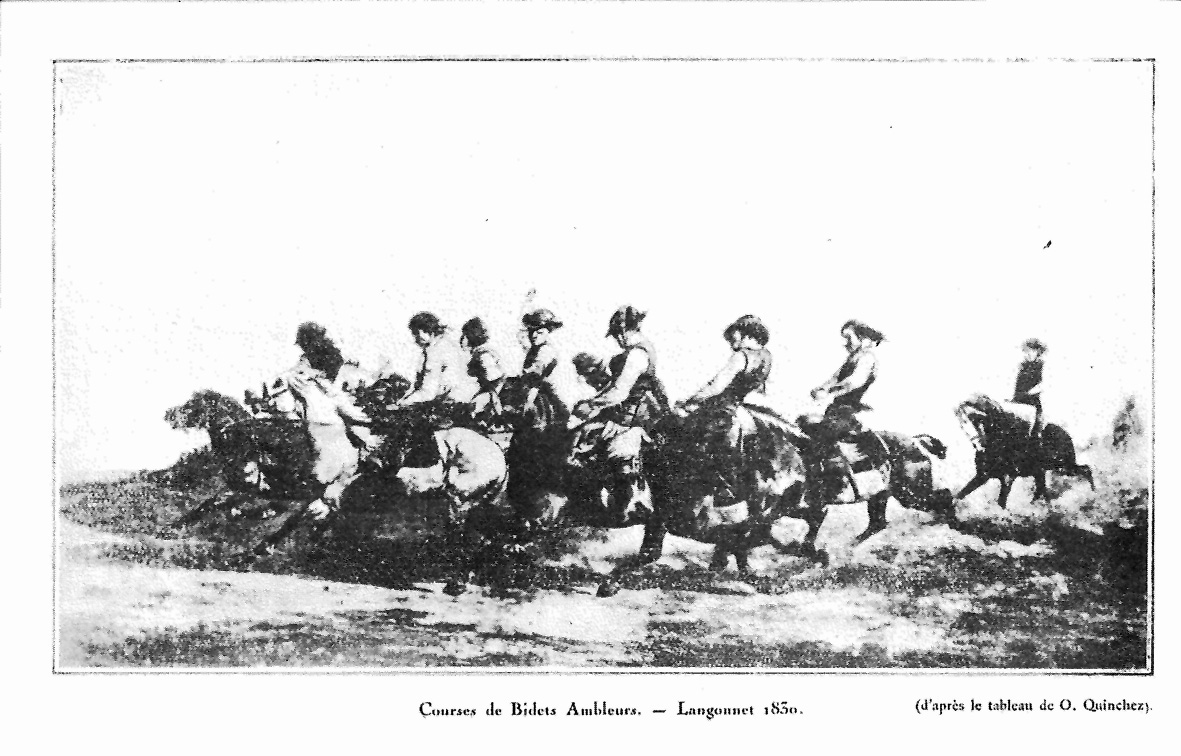
Races of ambling bidets in Langonnet in 1830.

Bidets left a lasting mark on popular culture, appearing in novels, folktales, expressions, and a nursery rhyme. Their memory is particularly strong in Brittany, where 19th-century folklorists documented the tradition of "steeple-to-steeple" races featuring local bidets, with mountain Breton bidets known for ambling. A folktale collected by Émile Souvestre, The Groac'h of Lok Island, mentions a stick transforming into a "red bidet from Saint-Thégonnec." Brittany regularly celebrates these small horses as part of its local history.

In the Picard dialect of the Boulonnais, the expression Descinds 'd tin bidét, t'es din 'l salon translates to "come back to earth and listen to what you're told."

=== Nursery rhymes ===
À dada, sur mon bidet is a French-language nursery rhyme sung by parents while bouncing a young child on their knees. The most common version is:

À dada sur mon bidet

Quand il trotte il fait des pets.

Prout, prout, prout cadet !

Numerous regional variants exist, including in Belgium and Switzerland.

French singer Jacques Dutronc incorporated the rhyme's lyrics into his song Fais pas ci, fais pas ça.

== In fiction ==
=== Literature ===
- Stendhal, in his novel Lucien Leuwen (1834), refers to "bidets costing ten to twelve louis, barely worthy of a well-dressed officer [...], and only good for a short ride; true bidets."
- Émile Moselly, in his novel Terres lorraines (1907), describes a countryside bidet hitched to a cabriolet, with a yellowish, muddy coat resembling a wild animal, emphasizing its resilience and "hellish gallop" despite its frail appearance.
- The bidet appears in Honoré de Balzac's novel The Country Doctor (1833) and in Henri Pourrat's Le Pavillon des amourettes, the third volume of Gaspard des montagnes (1930).
- In Alexandre Dumas's novel The Three Musketeers (1844), D'Artagnan travels to Paris on a "Béarn bidet."

== See also ==
- Breton bidet
- Cheval du Morvan
- Haguard horse
- List of French horse breeds

== Bibliography ==
- Moll, Louis; Gayot, Eugène Nicolas (1861). La Connaissance générale du cheval [General Knowledge of the Horse]. Didot. p. 722.
- Houël, Éphrem (1842). Traité complet de l'élève du cheval en Bretagne [Complete Treatise on Horse Breeding in Brittany]. E. Tostain.
- Barral, J. A. (1859). Journal d'agriculture pratique [Journal of Practical Agriculture]. Vol. 1. Librairie agricole de la maison rustique.
- Musset, René; Robien, Henry de (1917). L'Élevage du cheval en France [Horse Breeding in France]. Librairie agricole de la maison rustique. p. 232.
- Roche, Daniel; Reytier, Daniel (2007). "Pourquoi la victoire du poney sur le bidet ?". À cheval ! Écuyers, amazones & cavaliers du XIVe au XXIe siècle [On Horseback! Riders, Amazons & Cavaliers from the 14th to the 21st Century]. Association pour l'Académie d'art équestre de Versailles.
- Mulliez, Jacques (2004). Les Chevaux du royaume [The Horses of the Kingdom]. Histoire et société. Belin. p. 415. ISBN 2-7011-3281-9.
- Lizet, Bernadette (1989). La Bête noire [The Black Beast]. Ethnologie de La France. Vol. 10. éditions Maison des sciences de l'homme. p. 341. ISBN 2-7351-0317-X.
- Magne, Jean Henri (1857). Hygiène vétérinaire appliquée étude de nos races d'animaux domestiques et des moyens de les améliorer [Applied Veterinary Hygiene: Study of Our Domestic Animal Breeds and Ways to Improve Them]. Vol. 1. Labe. p. 287.
