= Mikael Bodlore-Penlaez =

French writer

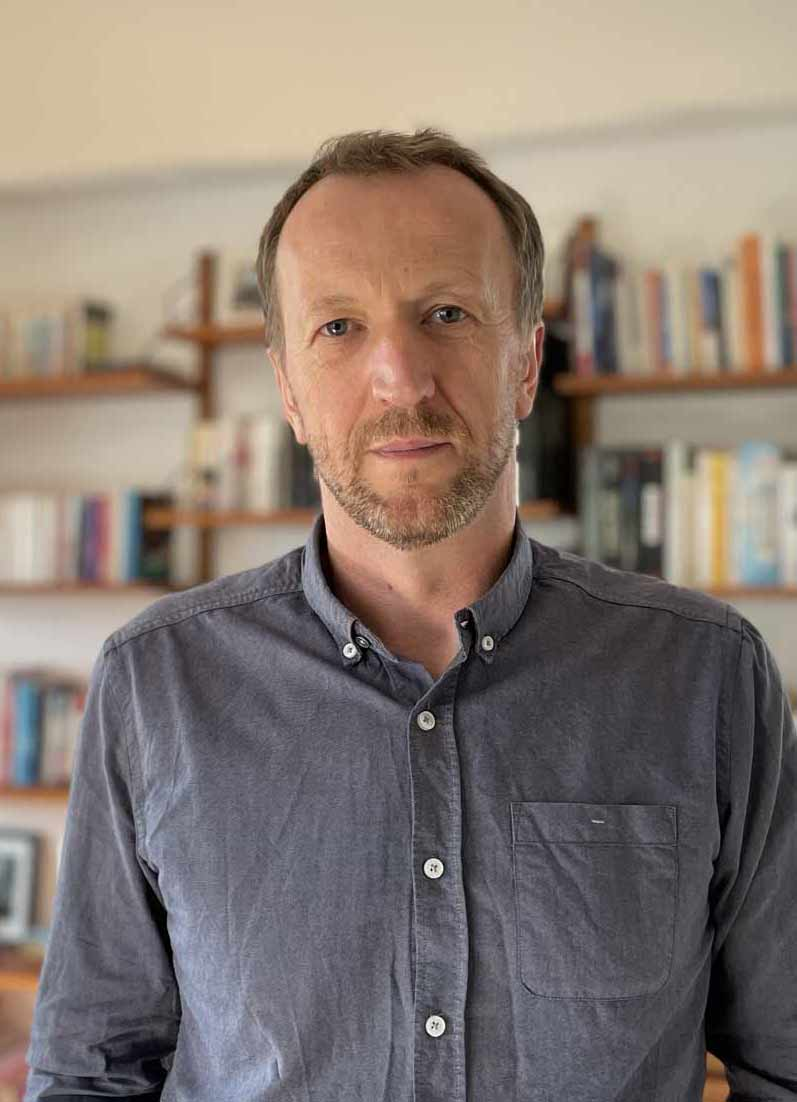
- Born: 24 February 1975 (age 51); Brest
- Occupation: Author
- Known for: Atlas, maps, Eurominority, stateless nations and minority studies

Mikael Bodlore-Penlaez (born 1975) is a Breton author and cartographer. He co-edited, with Divi Kervella, the first bilingual Atlas of Brittany (French / Breton) who has received several awards, including the "Brittany's Prize of the Book".

He was born in Brest.

== Bibliography ==
=== Books in English ===
- Atlas of Stateless Nations, minority peoples in search of recognition (translated in English by Ciaran and Sarah Finn), Ed. Y Lolfa, 2011 ISBN 978-1847713797

=== Books in French or (bilingual Breton/French) ===
- Guide des drapeaux bretons et celtes (Guide for Breton and Celtic flags) (with Divi Kervella), Ed. Yoran Embanner, 2008 ISBN 978-2-916579-12-2
- Atlas des Nations sans État, peuples minoritaires en quête de reconnaissance, Ed. Yoran Embanner, 2010 ISBN 978-2-914855-71-6
- Atlas de Bretagne / Atlas Breizh (Atlas of Brittany) (with Divi Kervella), Ed. Coop Breizh, 2011 ISBN 978-2843464959
- Musique classique bretonne / Sonerezh klasel Breizh (Breton classical music), Cras, Ladmirault, Le Flem, Le Penven, Ropartz... (with Aldo Ripoche), Ed. Coop Breizh, 2012 ISBN 978-2-84346-563-5
- Bretagne, les questions qui dérangent (Brittany, tough questions) (with Pierre-Emmanuel Marais & Lionel Henry), Ed. Yoran Embanner, 2014 ISBN 978-2-916579-78-8
- La France charcutée, petite histoire du "big bang" territorial" (Butchered France, brief history of the regional reform), Ed. Coop Breizh, 2014 ISBN 978-2-84346-722-6
- Atlas des mondes celtiques / Atlas ar bed keltiek (Atlas of Celtic world) (with Erwan Chartier-Le Floch & Divi Kervella), Ed. Coop Breizh, 2014 ISBN 978-2-84346-693-9
- Réunifier la Bretagne, région contre métropoles ? (with les Géographes de Bretagne, under the direction of Yves Lebahy and Gael Briand), Ed. Skol Vreizh, 2015 ISBN 978-2367580425
- Gwenn-ha-Du, le drapeau breton (collection "Trilogie des symboles de Bretagne"), Ed. Coop Breizh, 2015 ISBN 978-2843467233
- Bro Gozh ma Zadoù, l'hymne national breton (collection "Trilogie des symboles de Bretagne"), Ed. Coop Breizh, 2015 ISBN 978-2843467240
- BZH, l'abréviation bretonne (collection "Trilogie des symboles de Bretagne"), Ed. Coop Breizh, 2015 ISBN 978-2843467257

=== Maps ===
- European minority peoples, 2004
- Hundred Nations of Europe, 2005
- Genealogy of the Kings and Dukes of Brittany, 2007
- Brittany: Geography of an historical Nation of Europe (60 traditional counties), 2007
- 9 counties of Brittany, 2008
- Peoples of the world, 2009
- Frisian countries, 2010
- European languages, 2010
- Map of the world in breton, 2011
- Map of Val-de-Loire, 2012
- Map of Kurdistan, 2012
- European peoples, ethnographical map of nations and historical regions, 2012
