= Yann Brekilien =

Breton writer

Jean Sicard (11 December 1920, Paris – 12 March 2009), known as Yann Brekilien, was a Breton writer. Fighting in the French Resistance from 1941, he founded a secret journal with the Dupouy brothers and the sons of the bâtonnier Arrighi. In 1942, he entered the Ceux de la Résistance (CDLR) and the following year joined the maquis to escape the STO, hiding at Elliant, commanding an FFI section and fighting in the battles of summer 1945. After the war he worked as a magistrate as well as a prolific author, becoming founder and honorary president of the association des écrivains Bretons.

Brekilien died on 12 March 2009, at the age of 88.
