= Gouarec =

Gouarec Gwareg
- Commune
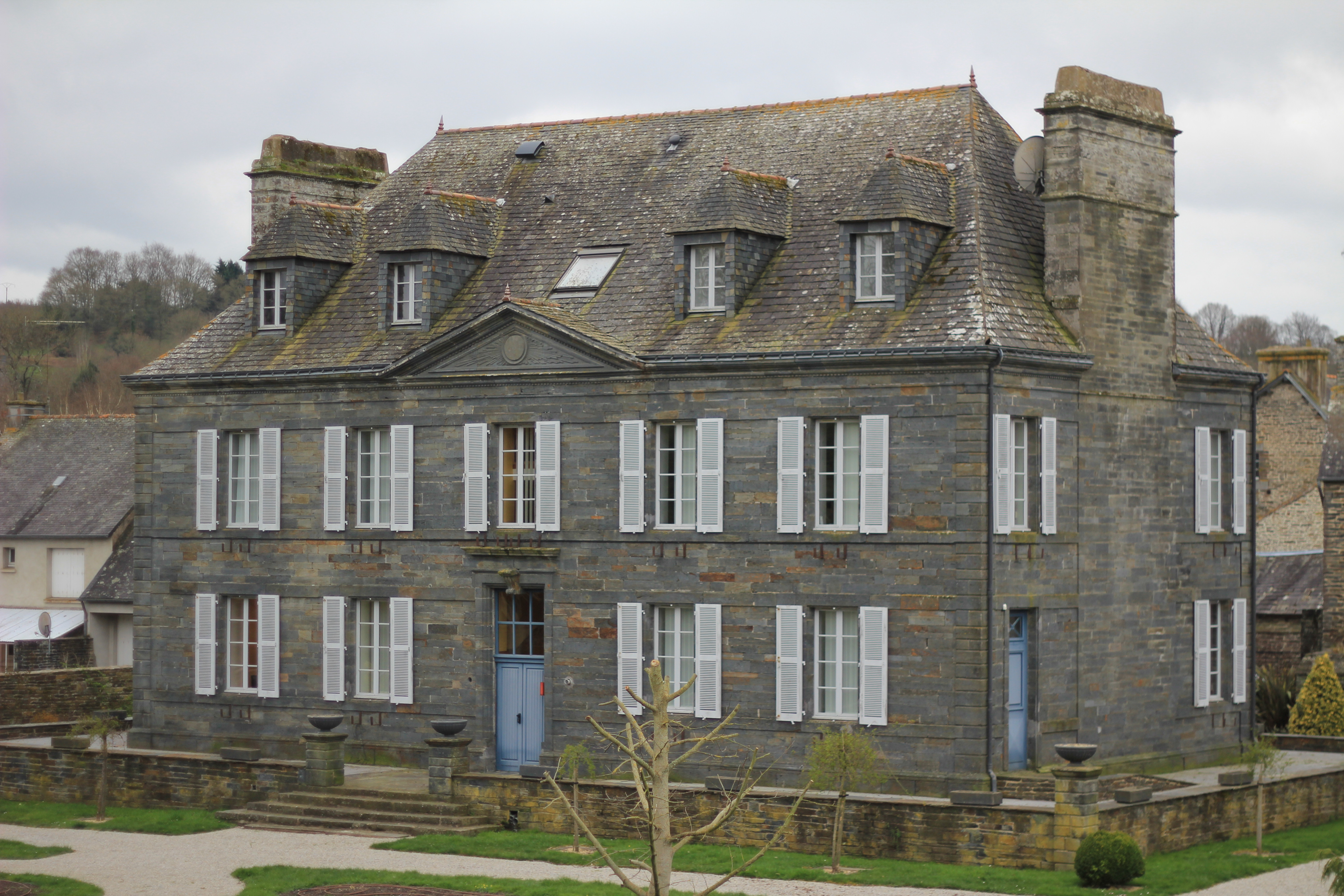
- The town hall of Gouarec

- Coat of arms
- Location of Gouarec
- Location within France Location within Brittany
- Coordinates: 48°13′38″N 3°10′46″W
- Country: France
- Region: Brittany
- Department: Côtes-d'Armor
- Arrondissement: Guingamp
- Canton: Rostrenen
- Intercommunality: Kreiz-Breizh

Government
  - Mayor (2020–2026): Jérôme Lejart
- Area^{1}: 6.41 km^{2} (2.47 sq mi)
- Highest elevation: 210 m (690 ft)
- Lowest elevation: 127 m (417 ft)
- Population (2023): 866
  - Density: 135/km^{2} (350/sq mi)
- Time zone: UTC+01:00 (CET)
  - Summer (DST): UTC+02:00 (CEST)
- INSEE/Postal code: 22064 /22570
- ^{1} French Land Register data, which excludes lakes, ponds, glaciers > 1 km^{2} (0.386 sq mi or 247 acres) and river estuaries.

Gouarec (French pronunciation: [ɡwaʁɛk]; Breton: Gwareg) is a commune in the Côtes-d'Armor department of Brittany in northwestern France.

== Population ==
Inhabitants of Gouarec are called gouarécains in French.

== See also ==
- Communes of the Côtes-d'Armor department
