= Trégor =

Historic province of Brittany

Coordinates: 48.7325°N 3.4553°W

Flag of Trégor since 1998

Flag of Trégor from 1996 to 1998

Trégor (French pronunciation: [tʁeɡɔʁ]; Breton: Treger, [ˈtɾeːɡəɾ]), officially the Land of Trégor (French: pays du Trégor; Breton: Bro-Dreger, [bɾoˈdɾeːɡəɾ]) is one of the nine traditional provinces of Brittany, in its northwestern area. It comprises the western part of the Côtes-d'Armor and a small part of the northeast of Finistère, as far as the river Morlaix. Its capital is Tréguier, the French translation of the Breton word Landreger (from lann, holy place, and Dreger, Treger with consonitic mutation, meaning Tregor).

Historical regions in Bretagne

Since the Morlaix was the boundary between the Bishopric of Léon and the Bishopric of Tréguier, the town was divided between the two.

On 27 January 1790, after the French Revolution, the Breton deputies rejected the request by the residents of Morlaix to be integrated in the same department as Saint-Brieuc. They instead established the northern boundary of the department at the Douron. So was constituted by division of the diocese of Tréguier, a Trégor which is called Finisterrian or Morlaisian. Traditionally, Tregorrois Breton is spoken here, which shows some dialectal differences.
