= Corlay horse =

French horse breed from Brittany

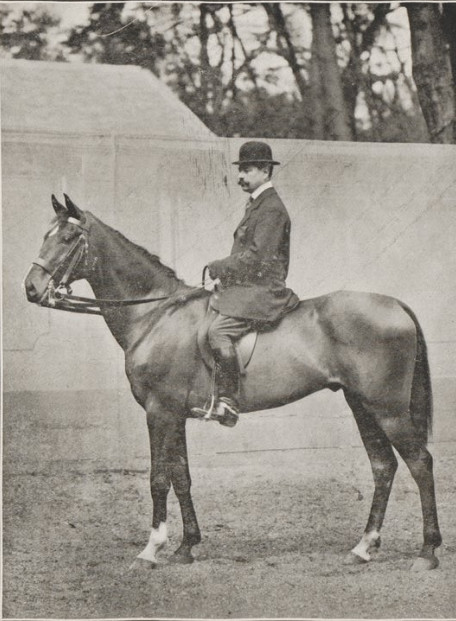
- Ivan, a 5 year old Corlay, won first prize in Paris in 1911 and 1912.
- Country of origin: Brittany, France
- Use: Riding horse

Traits
- Weight: From 465 to 470 kg
- Height: 1,50 to 1,60 m
- Color: Chestnut, buckskin, and bay

The Corlay horse is a breed of warmblood horse, raised around the town of Corlay in Brittany, that results from crossbreeding between local Breton bidet mares and imported stallions, primarily thoroughbreds.

Intended for racing, the Corlay variety of Breton horse is reputed to have impressed Napoleon III with its steeplechase abilities. As a result, local breeders specialized in this racehorse, optimizing its feed by adding maerl to the diet. The reputation of the Corlay horse breed grew from the mid to late 19th century. The most influential stallion in the breed was named Corlay, who bred from 1876 to 1897 in the locality of the same name. The breed was considered established by the end of the 19th century.

The Corlay horse's numbers declined steadily over the following century, primarily due to competition from draft horses. It virtually disappeared by the end of the 20th century. Having never had a genealogical register under its own name, it is now listed in France as an AQPS (Autre Que Pur-Sang) horse, a category for racehorses of all origins with a high proportion of Thoroughbred ancestry. The Corlay breed is considered extinct by the FAO.

== Etymology ==
The Corlay horse is also known as the "Half-Blood of Corlay" and the "Light Mountain Horse." Breeder F.-M. Bléas, author of a monograph for the Finistère deputy, refers to it as the "Breton Mountain Blood Horse." It is also nicknamed the "Good Breton Vintage of Saddle Horses."

== History ==
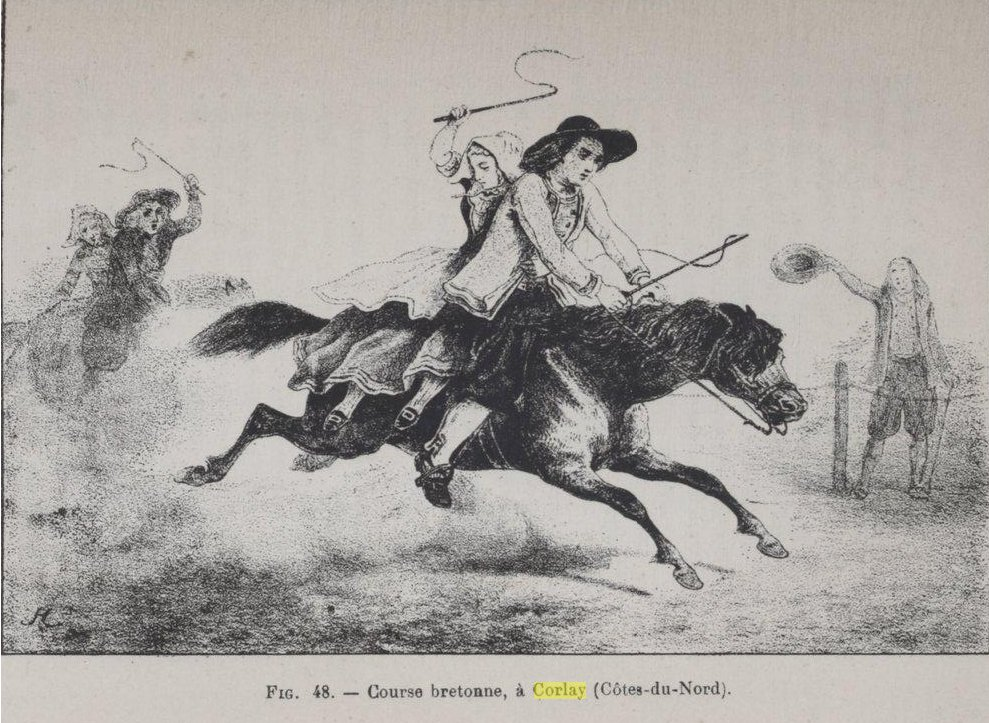
Horse race in Corlay, 1895

Breeding hot-blooded horses in Brittany was rare and specific to the Corlay region. According to veterinarian Dr. Robert Hamon, most Breton breeding at the beginning of the 20th century involved draft horses.

=== Origin ===
Before the Restoration, horse breeding in the Corlay region lacked specific selection processes. The breed's origins can only be traced back to the early 19th century. Records from the Corlay seigneury show that horse breeding and trading occurred under the Ancien Régime, often as part of the corvée system. These horses were typically sold at the Noyal-Pontivy fair.

The ancestors of the Corlay horse resemble the bidet horses of mountainous regions: small (1.20 m to 1.40 m at most), thin, and dry. Several authors, including the Société des Courses de Corlay, veterinarian Dr. Robert Hamon, and the president of the Association des Amis du Cheval du Pays de Corlay, attribute an Oriental ancestry to the Corlay horse. However, Jean Le Tallec's historical study of farmers in Central Brittany reveals no evidence of imported horses before the 19th century, apart from nine Arab stallions brought by the de Rohan family during the Crusades.

Sober, dexterous, and long-lived, bidets lived in a semi-wild state on the Breton moors and required minimal care. The variety of this small horse common to central and southern Brittany is known as the "Briec bidet" or "cheval de la lande."

=== Training ===
From 1806 to 1808, following the reorganization of the Haras Nationaux, Arabian stallions and a few Thoroughbreds were introduced to the region. The stallion depot in Langonnet, Morbihan, included half-saddlebred stallions and made its Thoroughbred horses available to local breeders. The first influential sires were the Arabian stallion Médany and the Thoroughbred stallions Young Emilius, Stangfort, and Young Rattler. The Corlay horse has also been influenced by other breeds, such as the Anglo-Norman, the Vendéen, mixed Norfolk Trotter and Thoroughbred, the Russian Orlov Trotter, and even the Percheron.

A popular Corlaysian expression highlights the locals' attachment to horses. According to Bléas, "No population, perhaps, had a greater innate love for the blood horse than that of this country. Any opportunity was always a good one for making horses fight. Until a few years ago, no wedding took place in a well-to-do family in the Corlays region without a sheep being offered as the prize for the traditional race; no 'pardon' was complete without 'running the sheep.' And many a peasant woman was not afraid to gallop her farm's brave pony during these festivities." Competition from racehorses from Paris and Anjou prompted local breeders to crossbreed their horses to produce saddle horses.

The size of these crossbred horses increased from 1.45 m to 1.58 m. The Corlay horse is the result of crossbreeding between native Breton horses, Thoroughbreds, and Arabians. According to Guy de Sallier Dupin, it was the distribution of premiums by the Conseil Général and the Haras Nationaux, which rewarded the best breeders, that enabled the emergence of pioneering breeders of warmblood horses in Corlay through crossbreeding with Thoroughbreds and Arabians.

=== Rise in reputation ===
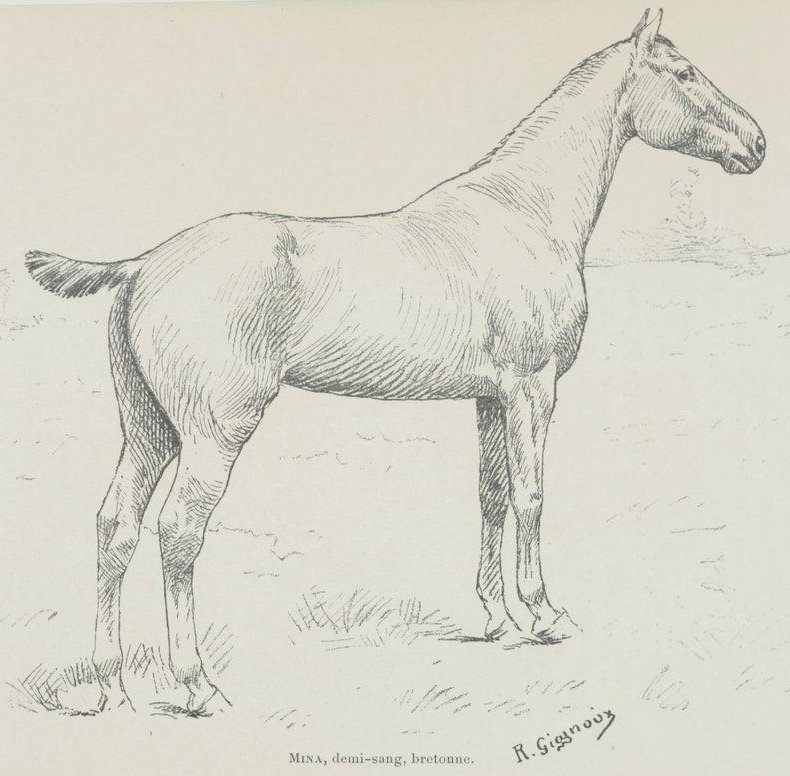
Mina, half-blood mare from Corlay, seen by R. Gignoux in Le Cheval de selle en France, A. Legoupy, 1898

Within a few decades, local breeding gained an excellent reputation. Count Achille de Montendre praised breeding in the Corlay region in a book published in 1840, calling the "Corlay breed" a horse of the future that "sells, and above all, will sell." His text was reprinted in an issue of Recueil de Médecine Vétérinaire the following year, and later by Éphrem Houël in his Traité Complet de l'Élevage du Cheval en Bretagne. The Corlay Racing Club was created in 1842, when the distribution of stallions was reorganized to favor the Corlay region.

In 1844, a report by the French agricultural inspectors for the Côtes-du-Nord department distinguished three breeds, including the Corlay breed. The horses were described as small (1.40 m) but of high quality. The report noted that horses not crossed with Arabs or Thoroughbreds sold much more cheaply and easily for light cavalry service.

In 1845, following the re-establishment of the Haras National de Lamballe, several Thoroughbred stallions were sent to Corlay: Craven, Brandy-Face, Festival, Gouvieux, Beauvais, Marin, Chassenon, Chambois, Basque, Kirsch, le Rakos, Vertumne, and Pedlar. The stud also housed the warmbloods Cœur de Chêne, Ementier, Infaillible, and Lancastre, as well as the Norfolk Trotter stallion Flying Cloud, sire of Corlay.

In 1849, the Guingamp equestrian commission recommended using Anglo-Arabs in addition to Thoroughbreds to improve the Corlay breed. By 1862, the Lamballe foal and filly competition was renamed the "Half-Bred and Light Draft Competition," requiring participants to run trotters or gallopers during the year. From 1864 onwards, premiums were only awarded to mares covered by a Thoroughbred or half-bred stallion from the stud farm administration.

In 1867, the rapporteur of a General Council session stated that "the Corlay breed surpasses in quality and elegance anything we have in Brittany." In 1880, a journalist wrote that the best warmblood horses came from the arrondissement of Loudéac. In 1897, Martial Cornic agreed, calling the Corlay horse "a national glory." By the beginning of the 20th century, bloodhorse breeding in Brittany was exclusively confined to the Corlay, Rostrenen, and Loudéac regions.

=== Influence of the Corlay stallion ===
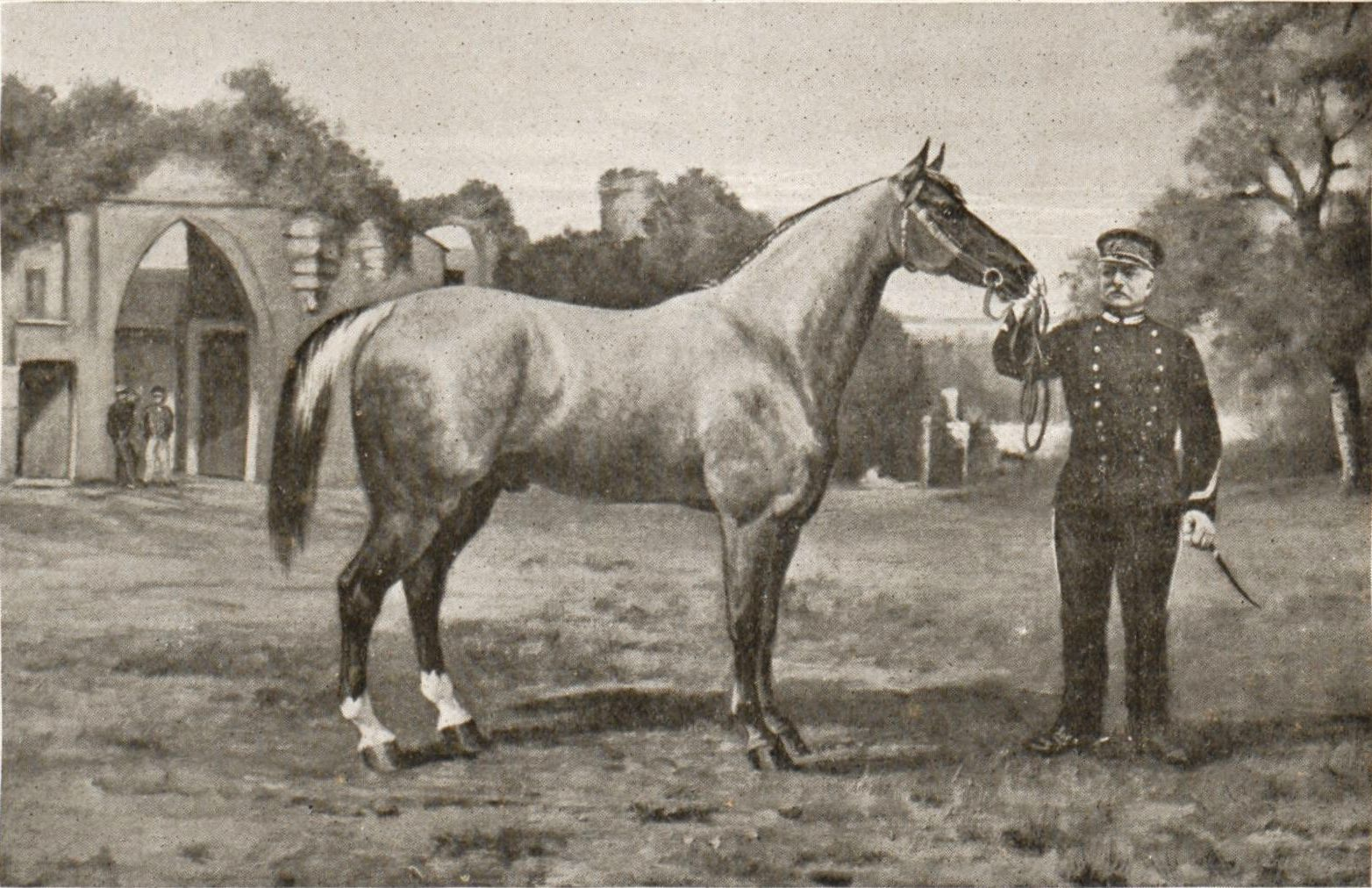
The Corlay stallion (1837–1895)

The Corlay horse owes part of its reputation to the breeding stallion named Corlay, who was considered by Bléas to be "perhaps the most famous stallion Brittany has ever had." In 1864, the first Norfolk Trotter, Flying Cloud, was introduced. By crossing Flying Cloud with a small 3/4 Thoroughbred Corlaysienne galloping mare named Thérésine, Corlay was born in 1872. He was used as a breeding stallion at the station of the same name for 21 years, from 1876 to 1897. Corlay sired a large number of offspring who excelled as carriage horses, racehorses, and saddle horses, and are renowned for their distinction.

=== Fixed ===
In 1894, the French studbook for warmblood horses was opened, including a Breton section. The 19th century ended with the disappearance of the breed's ancient and traditional type, the "bidet ambleur de Corlay." A local newspaper reported that the characteristics of the Corlay horse were now fixed: combining the size of the Thoroughbred with the gentleness of Breton bidets, "these horses are perfect."

In 1903, the Société Hippique de Corlay was established, organizing competitions. Competitions for yearling and two-year-old fillies made a significant contribution to improving the local breed. In 1905, the Corlay region acquired a racecourse, "Le Petit Paris." In 1908, Count Henry de Robien gave a negative review of the Corlay horse, describing it as "quick and flat."

In 1911, the director of the Corlay stud praised the constant improvement in breeding. Forage crops, particularly clover, were also helping to enhance animal feed. In 1928, the Société Hippique de Corlay published a 30-page study criticizing "the technocratic complacency of 'specialists,'" who deemed Breton horses as lacking reputation, describing them as "undistinguished, badly turned, disproportionate."

At the beginning of the 20th century, the most influential stallions of the breed were the warmblood Soliman, who died in 1916 and was known as the sire of excellent broodmares, and the Thoroughbreds Pedlar (1905–1919), Vertumne, Roncal, Rendez-vous, and Bon. The Corlay stud supplied 1,800 horses for World War I. Bloodstock breeding in Loudéac declined after the war.

=== Decline ===
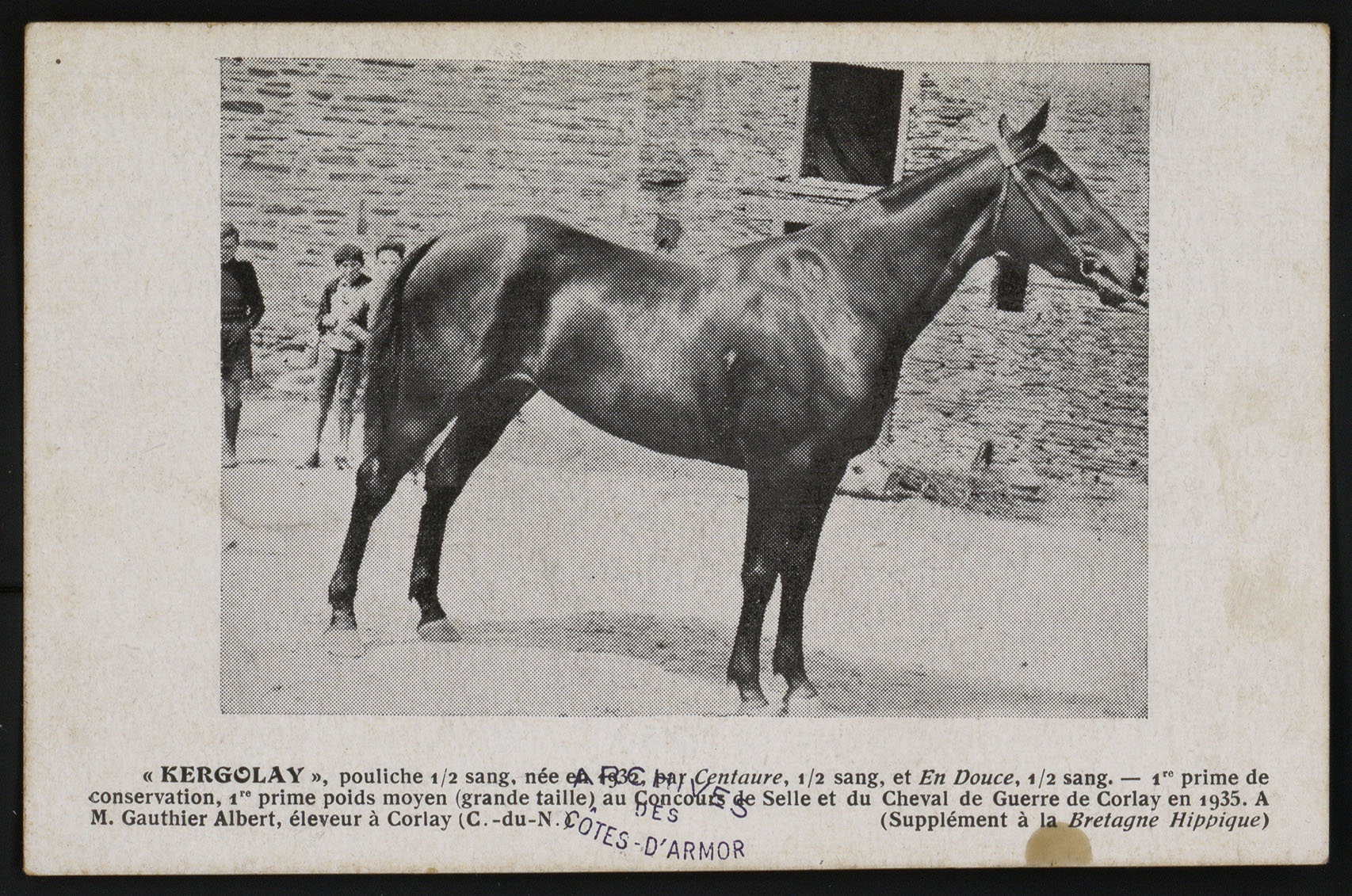
Half-bred filly from Corlay, 1935

Count Henry de Robien (1908) anticipated the breed's decline due to its lack of non-military outlets. He also described the breed as having disappeared twenty years earlier:

Twenty years ago – as you can see, I'm not going back to the Flood – there was a breed of very distinct, very homogeneous horses in Corlay. These horses were, for the most part, Rouans or Aubères. Well-built, welded, close to the ground, they were as usable in the saddle as in the carriage, as capable of leading oxen in the plow as they were of climbing a Breton embankment, and galloping for a long time behind the dogs.

— Count de Robien

In 1919, veterinarian Dr. E. Frouin, director of veterinary services for the Côtes-du-Nord, presented a report advising the abolition of saddle horse competitions in all towns in the department, except Corlay. He recommended increasing premiums to prevent the breed from disappearing. The breed was in decline, according to General de Champvallier (1921), zootechnician Paul Diffloth (1923), E. Frouin (1927–1928), and the Société hippique de Corlay (1928). They reported a significant reduction in the number of Thoroughbred and half-blood stallions between 1900 and 1927, as well as a decrease in Thoroughbred and half-blood breeding from 729 to 110 over the same period.

The reasons for this decline included competition from draft horses, notably the Breton horse; competition from motor vehicles; and the difficulty of finding quality breeding stallions. The model of the horses tended to be lighter and closer to the Thoroughbred. Diffloth asserted that the half-blood galloping breed was "doomed to disappear." By 1933, there were only around 120 Corlay broodmares left, all very heterogeneous in terms of type, depending on the proportion of Thoroughbred influence.

In 1927, the Société Hippique de Corlay estimated that Corlay horses had won a total of 500,000 francs in half-blood races.

== Description ==
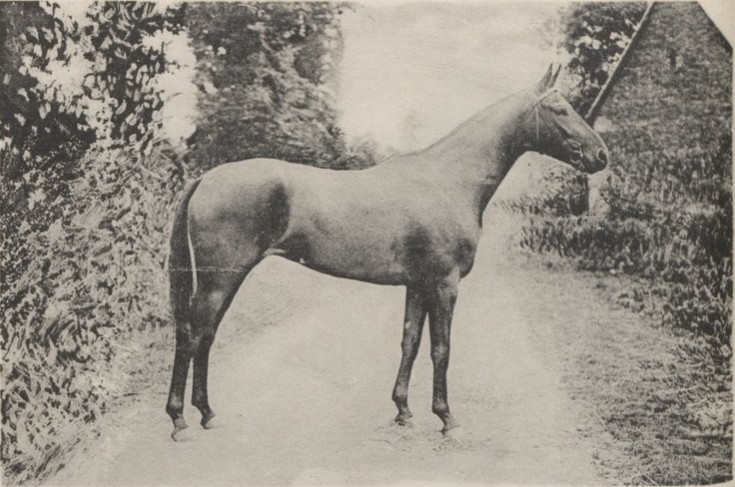
Venise XII, 3-year-old filly, 1924

The Corlay horse is historically a rather small, stocky half-blood, measuring around 1.50 to 1.55 m according to Italian author Maurizio Bongianni, and rarely exceeding 1.55 m according to Paul Diffloth. Its size has increased over time: an average measurement taken in 1898 estimates it at 1.52 to 1.56 m, while another taken in the 1930s gives an average of 1.56 m for 470 kg, with a thoracic perimeter of 1.82 m and a barrel circumference of 20 cm. F.-M. Bléas (1913) cites an average height of 1.57 m, with a thoracic perimeter of 1.75 m and a barrel circumference of 20 cm. In 1927, according to veterinarian E. Frouin's thesis, the average size was 1.53 to 1.60 m. In 1928 and 1933, the Société Hippique de Corlay and an article in Sport Universel Illustré reported an average height of 1.55 m for 465 kg, with a maximum of 1.63 m, as determined by the Société du Cheval de Guerre; a quarter of the breed's horses are over 1.58 m tall.

The breed conformation is that of a medium-weight saddle horse, with a strong Thoroughbred influence. According to Diffloth, the conformation is distinctive. The head is square and light, with an open eye. The neck is well-proportioned, and the body is rounded with high withers. The rump, like the overall conformation, is reminiscent of a bloodhorse. The shoulders have good direction, and the limbs, though not very ample, are lean, sinewy, and vigorously jointed. The tendons are well-defined, and the feet are of good quality.

According to Barral, the dominant coat colors are chestnut, buckskin, and bay, with a few gray and black. However, Count de Robien states that the dominant colors are mainly roan and strawberry roan.

The Corlay horse's gaits are lively, and its movements are graceful. It is reputed to be a "true saddle horse full of energy, hardiness, and means, which inspires confidence in the rider," endowed with energy and stamina while remaining rustic and sober. Compared to the Thoroughbred, it has less pure speed but is renowned for its endurance. It also has good galloping class and great jumping ability.

== Management and breeding ==
They are bred economically, usually in combination with free-range cattle. Foals are broken in at two and a half to three years of age.

This breed is raised outdoors in rugged pastures where it feeds on clover and gorse, supplemented with oats. One of the particularities of Corlay horse breeding is the use of maerl to strengthen the horses' bones by mixing it with their feed. Napoleon III allowed breeders to obtain maerl from the Brest harbor and transport it via the Nantes-Brest canal. Breeders also used bone char, or noir de raffinerie, a phosphate-rich by-product of the Nantes sugar industry, as a feed supplement. Later, by mining a limestone vein (the only one in central Brittany) at Cartravers, near Corlay, breeders enriched their pastures with calcium.

The Corlay horse has never had its own studbook, and is now listed as an AQPS. The Société Hippique de Corlay, founded in 1903 by Armand Gast, was tasked with promoting this local breed. The distribution of "conservation premiums" to owners of mares under 7 years of age seems to have played a key role in the preservation of the Corlay breed.

== Usage ==
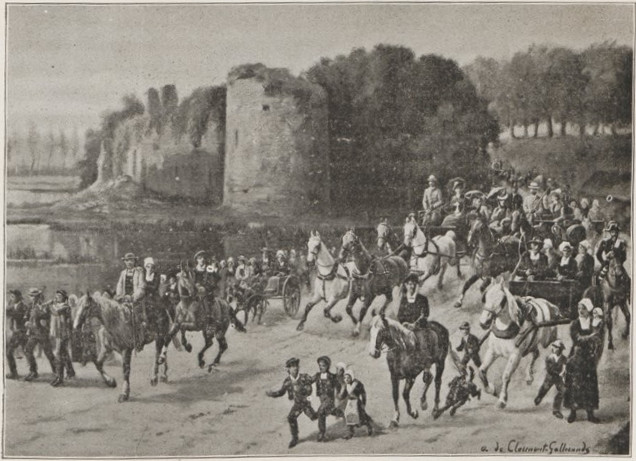
Departure for the races at Corlay, painting by Adhémar Louis Gaspard de Clermont-Gallerande, 1889

The breed's ancestors were employed by the Côtes-d'Armor horse postrider. The Corlay horse is mainly used for local racing, thanks to the speed inherited from its Arab and Thoroughbred ancestors. An often-told anecdote recounts that Napoleon III examined some of them during his visit to Saint-Brieuc in August 1858 and was informed that these horses could, without any preparation, deliver a steeplechase of several kilometers over any type of terrain. The following morning, this steeplechase was run in front of him on very uneven ground soaked by torrential rain. Out of twelve horses running, ten reached the finish without incident, ridden without saddle or stirrups and led by simple nets or with their loins by young farmers.

When racing, the Corlay horse is usually mounted in a bridle with a hard bit in the mouth, to which a rope is tied. It is reputed to be able to complete the tests "without fatigue." In the 20th century, there were races in Brittany reserved for half-breds, in which Corlay horses took part.

The breed was also recommended for light cavalry in the nineteenth and early twentieth centuries, as well as for trail riding, Amazon riding, and tilbury pulling. Several "tours de force" are attributed to the Corlay horse, including journeys of up to a hundred kilometers in a single day. According to Diffloth (1923), "Some individuals are capable of executing raids of 100 and 120 kilometers in a day. A mare from Corlay covered 48 kilometers in one hour and a half at a harness trot, and a horse from Corlay recently covered 28 kilometers in one hour at a harness trot."

At the beginning of the 20th century, military sales represented the main outlet for this breed, notably through the Société du Cheval de Guerre competitions. The breed made its mark several times at the Société Hippique Française, particularly through representatives such as Octave II, Diane, Cyclone, Yvan, and Fat. It performed exceptionally well in hunting trials and multi-day raids over rough terrain, with its ability to negotiate natural obstacles being particularly commended. Corlay horses have historically been popular at outdoor horse races, with Corlaysians attending these events in large numbers.

== Breeding range ==
The town of Corlay owes its reputation to this breed of horse. Its historic production center is located in the Corlay area, south of Guingamp, and in part of the Loudéac arrondissement. Some horses were exported; for example, Lionel Bonnemère found traces of a Corlay horse in Spain in 1901, noting that breeding had significantly contributed to the canton's prosperity. The breed is highly local and has steadily declined over the years. By 1927, according to E. Frouin, only three or four dozen Corlay breeder families were maintaining the local breed. The horse practically disappeared by the end of the 20th century. The town of Corlay has opened a museum to trace its history, making it one of five sites in Brittany recognized as an "equestrian center of regional interest."

The breed is listed as extinct (status "X") in the 2007 FAO assessment, under the name "Corlais."

In 2005, half-blood breeding remained important in the Corlay region, complementing other types of breeding. Races reserved for AQPS horses were organized here.

== See also ==
- List of French horse breeds
- Corlay (stallion)

== Bibliography ==
=== Books ===
- Société hippique de Corlay (1928). Le cheval de selle de Corlay (in French). imprimerie Prud'homme.
- Barral, J. A. (1859). Journal d'agriculture pratique (in French). Librairie agricole de la maison rustique.
- Bléas, F.-M. (1913). Les chevaux bretons (in French). imp. A. Lajat.
- de Comminges, Marie-Aimery (1898). Le cheval de selle en France (in French). A. Legoupy.
- Diffloth, Paul (1923). Zootechnie. Races chevalines. Elevage et Exploitation des chevaux de trait et des chevaux de selle (in French) (5th ed.). libr. J.-B. Baillière et fils.
- Edwards, Elwyn (1994). The Encyclopedia of the Horse (1st ed.). Dorling Kindersley. ISBN 1564586146.
- Frouin, E. (1927). Le cheval breton (in French). imp. moderne.
- Hamon, Robert (1940). Le cheval de Corlay: Thèse de l'École Nationale Vétérinaire d'Alfort (in French). Vigot Frères.
- Bongianni, Maurizio (1988). Simon & Schuster's Guide to Horses and Ponies (in French). Simon & Schuster. ISBN 0-671-66068-3.
- Saint-Gal de Pons, Antoine-Auguste (1931). Origines du cheval breton. Le Haras de Langonnet. Les Dépôts de Lamballe et d'Hennebont. Le Dépôt de remonte de Guingamp. Celjoarion.
- de Robien, Henry (1908). Norfolk-Breton. Au pays de Cornouaille: avec 25 illustrations (in French). Laveur.
- de Sallier Dupin, Guy (1998). Le cheval chez les Bretons des Côtes-d'Armor: De l'Ancien régime à la Grande Guerre (in French). Coop Breizh.

=== Articles ===
- General Champvallier (1921). Chevaux de Corlay. Revue de cavalerie.
- Pedlar (1933). L'élevage du demi-sang en Bretagne (in French). Paris: Le Sport universel illustré.
- Poirier, A. (2005). Corlay, cœur breton (in French). Of course.
- de Sainte Marie, Tanneguy (2012). "Races, types, tribus ou ethnies des chevaux de courses au xixe siècle". In Situ (18). In Situ, revue des patrimoines. doi:10.4000/insitu.9683.
