= Penda (given name) =

Penda is a feminine given name of Senegalese origin. In the European Early Middle Ages, it was also a masculine name used in the Anglo-Saxon kingdoms.

== People ==
- Penda of Mercia (died 655), a 7th-century king
- Penda Hair, American civil rights lawyer
- Penda Ly (born 1991), Senegalese beauty pageant titleholder
- Penda Mbow (born 1955), Senegalese politician, historian, and activist
- Penda Sy (born 1984), French-Senegalese basketball player

== See also ==
- Pænda (born 1989), Austrian singer
