= Miss Senegal =

Beauty pageant

Comité Miss-Sénégal nouvelle vision
- Formation: 1960
- Type: Beauty pageant
- Headquarters: Dakar
- Location: Senegal
- Members: Miss Universe; Miss World
- Official language: French
- President: Amina Badiane; SE.CO.BA (Communication Service Badiane)
- Website: misssenegal.sn

Miss Sénégal is a national beauty pageant in Senegal. It is the national contest to choose the representative for the Miss Universe pageant.

== History ==
Miss Senegal was founded in 1960 by the Ministry of Tourism, Senegal. The winner becomes national goodwill ambassador of her country. In January 2016, Miss Senegal rights belong to Amina Colle Badiane as the new president of Miss Senegal. She has evolved over many years in Europe (especially Italy and France) as a professional model. Subsequently, it was also host and presenter at major Italian television channels.

== Organizers ==
- 1974—Government of Tourism in Senegal
- 1985—Moise Ambroise Gomis Directorship
- 2016—Amina Badiane SE.CO.BA (Communication Service Badiane) Directorship

=== Format ===
The first edition of Miss Senegal Nouvelle Vision has achieved its objective of reviving Senegal's cultural and tourist assets at both national and international level. It allowed the organization of 14 regional finals and the National Grand Final which closed the edition.

=== Franchise holders ===
As tradition the main winner usually competed at Miss Universe pageant. Began new foundation in 2016 the Miss Senegal purposed to return at Miss Universe pageant. It stills unknown that the country might comeback after so many years did not present at Miss Universe competition. In recent moment the President of Miss Senegal received a mandatory to send a winner to upcoming Miss World began in 2019.

In 2024, Miss Senegal made a triumphant return to the Miss Universe stage. Senegal last competed in Miss Universe in 1987, marking a significant gap before their re-entry this year.

== Titleholders ==
=== Miss Sénégal ===
Year	Miss Sénégal	Region
1960	Fatou Ba	Dakar
1974	Thioro Thiam	Fatick
1985	Chantal Loubelo	Dakar
1986	Maria Diéye	Dakar
1987	Fabienne Joelle Feliho	Dakar
1990	Madina Camara	Tambacounda
1992	Aissatou Nathalie Dia	Dakar
1997	Maïmouna Diallo	Kolda
1998	Aïcha Faye	Dakar
1999	Yaye Astou Cissé	Kaolack
2000	Mamy Camara	Tambacounda
2001	Mame Diarra Mballo	Dakar
2002	Marième Camara	Kaolack
2003	Khadija Guèye	Matam
2004	Aminata Dieye	Dakar
2005	Maria Magdalena Vertomen Diop	Saint-Louis
2006	Khady Bâ	Matam
2007	Aminata Diallo	Dakar
2008	Fatimata Diallo	Matam
2009	Katy Chimère Diaw	Dakar
2011	Tacko Fatim Thiam	Dakar
2012	Penda Ly	Dakar
2013	Marie Thérèse Ndiaye	Thiès
2014	Anna Diouf	Thiès
2016	Ndeye Astou Sall	Dakar
2017	Yacine Dieng Thiam	Thiès
2019	Alberta Diatta	Ziguinchor
2021	Ndèye Fatma Dione	Fatick
2022	Fatou L'eau	Dakar
2024	Mame Fama Gaye	Fatick

=== Miss Univers Sénégal ===
Year	Miss Univers Sénégal	Region
2024	Fatou Bintou Guèye	Louga
2025	Camilla Diagne	Dakar

=== Wins by region ===
Province	Titles	Years
Dakar	15	1960, 1985, 1986, 1987, 1992, 1998, 2001, 2004, 2007, 2009, 2011, 2012, 2016, 2022, 2025 (Universe)
Fatick	3	1974, 2021, 2024
Thiès	3	2013, 2014, 2017
Matam	3	2003, 2006, 2008
Tambacounda	2	1990, 2000
Kaolack	2	1999, 2002
Louga	1	2025 (Universe)
Ziguinchor	1	2019
Saint-Louis	1	2005
Kolda	1	1997

== Titleholders under Miss Sénégal org. ==
=== Miss Sénégal Univers ===
Color key

- : Declared as Winner
- : Ended as runner-up
- : Ended as one of the finalists or semi-finalists
- : Ended as Special awards winner

Miss Universe in Senegal is the oldest international license since 1974. Former Miss-Sénégal winners went to Miss Universe. Began 2024 the new Miss Sénégal organization took over the license and set Senegal back to the arena. On occasion, when the winner does not qualify (due to age) for either contest, a runner-up is sent.

Year	Province	Miss-Sénégal	Placement at Miss Universe	Special awards	Notes
Amina Badiane directorship — a franchise holder to Miss Universe from 2024
Did not compete in 2026
2025	Dakar	Camilla Diagne	Unplaced		
2024	Louga	Fatou Bintou Guèye	Unplaced		Fatou Bintou Guèye was appointed by Miss Senegal Organization. She was a runner-up of Miss Senegal 2024. The main winner allocated to Miss World 2025.
Moise Ambroise Gomis directorship — a franchise holder to Miss Universe from 1985―1987
Did not compete between 1988―2023
1987	Dakar	Fabienne Joelle Feliho	Unplaced		
1986	Dakar	Maria Diéye	Did not compete		
1985	Dakar	Chantal Loubelo	Unplaced		
Government of Tourism in Senegal directorship — a franchise holder to Miss Universe in 1974
Did not compete between 1975―1984
1974	Fatick	Thioro Thiam	Unplaced		

=== Miss Sénégal Monde ===
Color key

- : Declared as winner
- : Ended as runner-up
- : Ended as one of the finalists or semi-finalists
- : Ended as special awards winner

Below is the Miss Sénégal Monde winners under the auspices of the Miss Sénégal Organization(2019―present). The Miss Sénégal Monde pageant was first staged in 2017 by a different organization.

Year	Province	Miss-Sénégal Monde	Placement at Miss World	Special awards	Notes
Amina Badiane directorship — a franchise holder to Miss World from 2019
2027	TBA	TBA	TBA		
2026	Dakar	Fatoumata Diop	Top 20		
2025	Fatick	Mame Fama Gaye	Unplaced		
Miss World 2023 was rescheduled to 2024 due to the change of host and when entering India as the new host, there were several issues that caused the postponement until March 2024.
2023	Dakar	Fatou L'eau	Unplaced		
Miss World 2021 was rescheduled to 16 March 2022 due to the COVID-19 pandemic outbreak in Puerto Rico, no edition started in 2022.
2021	Tambacounda	Penda Sy	Unplaced		Chosen as Miss World Senegal 2021 by Miss Senegal New Vision committee.
Due to the impact of COVID-19 pandemic, no competition held in 2020
2019	Ziguinchor	Alberta Diatta	Unplaced		
