= Corlay (stallion) =

French named Corlay horse

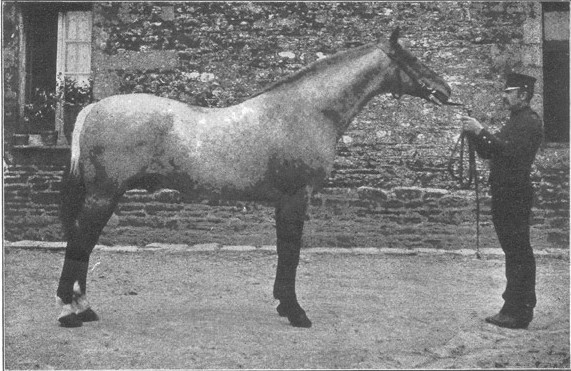
- Sire: Flying Cloud
- Dam: Thérésine
- Sex: Male
- Foaled: Pénitence, Voltaire, Glazard, Martial, Atao, Focking, and Gladi; Canihuel
- Died: 1897; Corlay

Corlay (1872-1897) was a stallion close to the Thoroughbred, head of the Corlay horse breed, considered in his day to be one of Brittany's most famous and influential stallions. The history of this sturdy roan horse is steeped in legend. It is generally accepted that he was the son of Flying Cloud, a Norkfolk Trotter stallion imported from England to Brittany in 1864, and a local three-quarter Thoroughbred mare, Thérésine.

Corlay had a short but successful career in trotting, with two victories in 1875. Purchased by the Haras Nationaux in France, he was bred for 21 years in the commune of Corlay, Côtes-d'Armor, until his death in 1897. He sired numerous offspring renowned for their elegance and versatility, including the stallions Voltaire and Focking, horses sold to the French cavalry, famous brood mares and, according to one account, the favorite mount of Spanish King Alfonso XIII.

== History ==
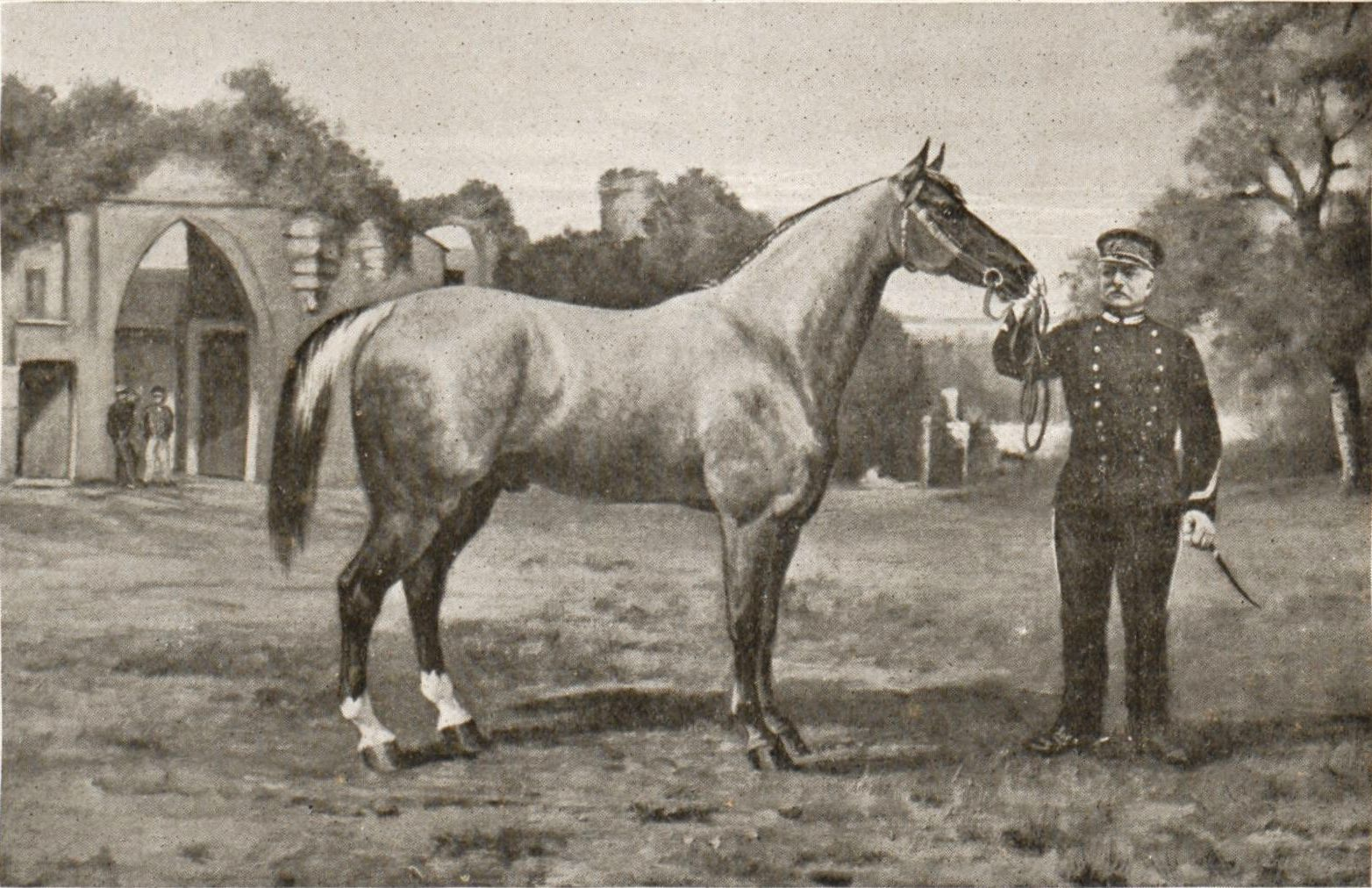
Reproduction d'un tableau d'Adhémar Louis Gaspard de Clermont-Gallerande (1837-1895) représentant Corlay.

Corlay is descended from the first Norfolk Trotter introduced to the Corlay breeding station, Flying Cloud, a stallion born in 1856 and imported from Yorkshire, England, to Lamballe in 1864. This stallion was brought to Corlay at the end of his career, after having bred for years in the Pays de Léon, siring Breton horses.

Corlay's dam, Thérésine, is unregistered but reputed to be descended from three Thoroughbred ancestors. Legend has it that she was a very successful galloper, being covered by Flying Cloud on the very day of a victory at Corlay. However, Colonel Charpy gives another version, which he claims comes from the breeder of the Corlay stallion, Mr. Poezevara: Thérésine only came out of her meadow or stable to be presented at broodmare shows, where she had some success.

Another legendary origin makes Corlay the son of Bédouin, an oriental stallion brought back from the Portes mission, and who, it is said, "was sold by the cheick of Beha, his master, unable to pay, at the time, the pasha of Aleppo an advance he had imposed on him. The cheick was so jealous that he would never allow anyone to see him".

Corlay was born in 1872 to M. Poezevara, in Canihuel. He was sold at the age of 18 months to Mr. Léon-Guillaume Le Roux, who trained him in trotting races. He soon became a successful winner, taking the Prix Bazus (or Bazas) at Toulouse with a kilometer reduction of 1 min 45 s in 1875, over 4,000 meters, in 9 min. A trotting race report dated 1877 indicates that at the age of 3 (1875) he won the Prix du Gouvernement, over the same distance, in 8 min 49 s, his owner consequently winning the 4,000-franc prize.

Purchased by the Haras Nationaux in France for 6,000 francs, Corlay was used as a breeding stallion at the breeding station of the same name for 21 years, from 1876 to 1897. He probably died that same year.

== Description ==
Corlay measured 1.56 m or 1.57 m at the withers, making him a medium-sized horse by the standards of the time. Reputed to be "of a very pleasing model", he was strong and powerful, very much influenced by the Thoroughbred. He was described as "a little short in his lines, but very well limbed, close to the ground". His shoulders and loins, renowned for their quality, are said to have been inherited from his sire, Flying Cloud.

His coat is roan or strawberry roan.

== Origins ==
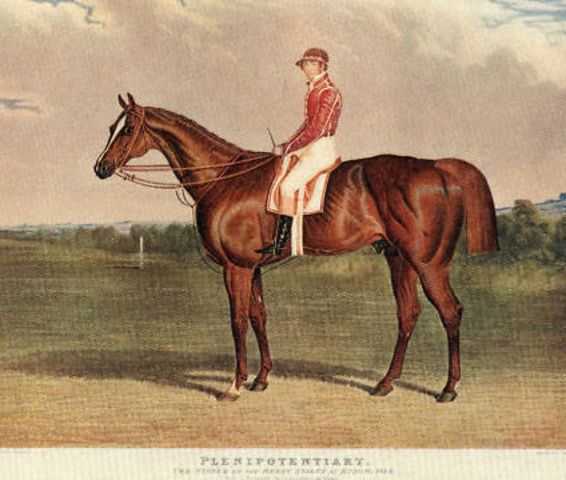
The chestnut Thoroughbred Plenipotentiary, one of Corlay's ancestors.

Corlay's sire, Flying Cloud, was a bay-colored Norfolk-English stallion, a bit racy, distinguished, with a short neck, but shoulders and loins renowned for their quality. His dam was a small 3/4 Thoroughbred Corlaysian galloping mare named Thérésine, born at Kerbouelen, "la ferme des genêts", known for having had two Thoroughbreds, an Anglo-Arab and an Arab among her ancestors. Of roan or strawberry roan coat, she is renowned for her bad temper, has never been shod and has never raced. Thérésine's mother, Cocotte, a half-blood of strong build, daughter of the Thoroughbred Craven, was known in the region for her service on the horse post between Quintin (or Gourin) and Carhaix, and was also of a roan coat, with a vinous appearance.

Thérésine's sire is a thoroughbred stallion named Festival. The Count of Comminges cites Corlay's pedigree, insisting on the presence of Thoroughbred ancestors.

Corlay is registered in the database of the Institut Français du Cheval et de l'Equitation as a French Trotter son of Flying Cloud and Thérésine, but the names recorded differ from those in the documents of the time, since the sire of Thérésine's dam is listed as "Lully".

Pedigree of Corlay (1872-1897)
| Sire Flying Cloud (1856) | No info | No info | No info |
| Sire Flying Cloud (1856) | No info | No info | No info |
| Sire Flying Cloud (1856) | No info | No info | No info |
| Sire Flying Cloud (1856) | No info | No info | No info |
| Sire Flying Cloud (1856) | No info | No info | No info |
| Sire Flying Cloud (1856) | No info | No info | No info |
| Sire Flying Cloud (1856) | No info | No info | No info |
| Sire Flying Cloud (1856) | No info | No info | No info |
| Dam Thérésine (1864) | Festival (1851) | Nuncio (1839) | Plenipotentiary (1831) |
| Dam Thérésine (1864) | Festival (1851) | Nuncio (1839) | Alley (1818) |
| Dam Thérésine (1864) | Festival (1851) | Bienséance (1844) | Friedland (1835) |
| Dam Thérésine (1864) | Festival (1851) | Bienséance (1844) | Miss-Ann (1827) |
| Dam Thérésine (1864) | Cocotte | Lully (1850) | No info |
| Dam Thérésine (1864) | Cocotte | Lully (1850) | No info |
| Dam Thérésine (1864) | Cocotte | No info | No info |
| Dam Thérésine (1864) | Cocotte | No info | No info |

== Descent ==
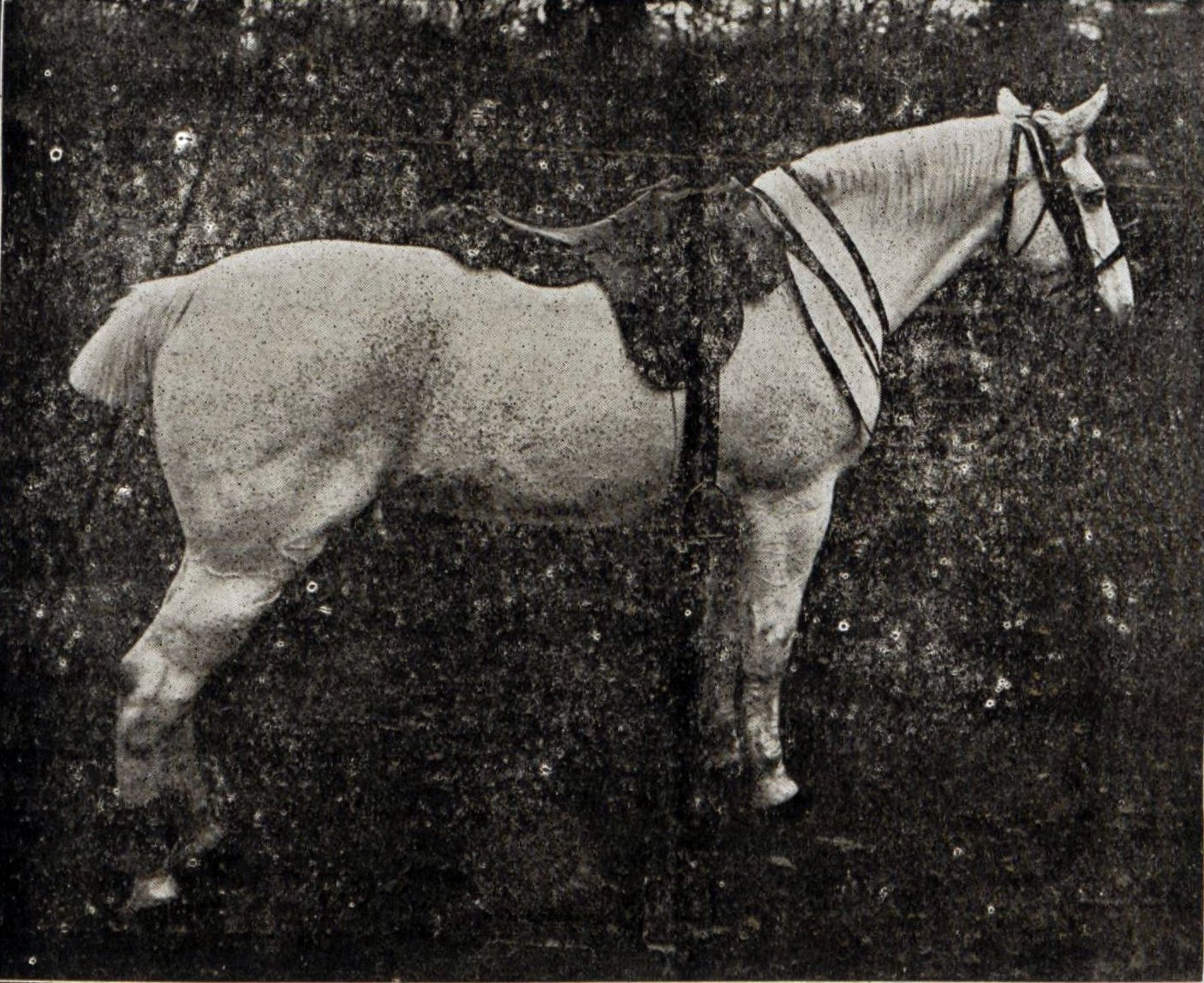
Miss Castel, a hunting mare and daughter of Corlay.

Marie-Aimery de Comminges wrote of Corlay that he had "done much for Breton breeding". A. Gast (1907) considers that "the apogee of Montagne breeding is due, without question, to the stallion Corlay". He is considered by Count Henry de Robien as a "worthy breed leader", by Breton breeder F.-M. Bléas as "perhaps the most famous stallion Brittany has ever had", by veterinary surgeon Dr. E. Frouin as an "incomparable breeder", and by Paul Diffloth as having "contributed powerfully to the improvement of Breton breeding". German author Carl Gustav Wrangel wrote of the stallion Flying Cloud in 1908: "Letzterer war der Vater des in der Bretagne zu hohem Ansehen gelangten Corlay".

"It can be said that the Mountain stallion Corlay, out of a Norfolk and a steeple mare, transformed Cornouaille breeding"

— Paul Diffloth, Zootechnie

Corlay is reputed to have been very fertile. He sired a large number of offspring who excelled as carriage horses, racehorses and saddle horses, and are renowned for their distinction, quality, model and ability. Famous descendants include the stallion Voltaire, son of the mare Mina, herself by the Thoroughbreds Éperon and Sting, and the Arab Kérim. Voltaire rode for the Huon brothers throughout Brittany, Normandy and at Vincennes, earning a total of over 20,000 francs according to Louis Cauchois. Count de Robien owned descendants of Corlay, including Focking, ex Daman. M. Le Gualès de Mézaubran is reputed to have owned Breton Norfolk horses from Corlay, of roan-auberized coat, "which jumped remarkable heights in Paris". Lionel Bonnemère testified in 1901 that a member of his family had found a horse in the stables of the Royal Palace in Madrid, billed as the favorite of King Alfonso XIII, which turned out to be a son of Corlay. Other stallions, bearing the names Atao, Glazard, Martial, Grippesou, Innachus and Corlay II, are cited as his descendants. His son Gladi, owned by Count Le Gualès de Mézaubran, is said to have won numerous prizes under saddle, in driving and jumping, notably in 1889.

In the Harasire database, only one descendant is recorded for Corlay, a trotting mare named Pénitence, from a cross with the mare Rose d'Avril, by the Thoroughbred Gouvieux. Count Henry de Robien reported seeing her at a provincial show, aged three, without imagining that she would become the grandmother of his horse Samos, by Focking.

Corlay is most famous for the quality of her daughters, especially those from Thoroughbred or Anglo-Norman mares, notably Bagatelle, Brunette, Belle-Étoile, Christiane and Diaouless.

According to Viscount Maurice Jacques-Marie-Maurice Goislard de Villebresme (1910), remounts paid up to 1,200 francs for some Corlay sons, but the average selling price was 1,000 francs. According to Count Henry de Robien, the stallion regularly bequeaths his typical coat color, rouan or aubère, to his descendants, which constitutes a sort of "Breton cachet". This coat color is then in demand, leading to an increase in the purchase price of around 10%.

== See also ==
- Corlay horse

== Bibliography ==
- Bléas, F. M. (1913). Les chevaux bretons (in French). imp. A. Lajat.
- de Comminges, Marie-Aimery (1898). Le cheval de selle en France (in French). Paris: A. Legoupy.
- Diffloth, Paul (1923). Zootechnie. Races chevalines. Elevage et Exploitation des chevaux de trait et des chevaux de selle (in French) (5th ed.). Paris: libr. J.-B. Baillière et fils.
- Frouin, E. (1927). Le cheval breton (in French). Saint-Brieuc, imp. moderne.
- Gast, E. (1907). Essai sur la Bretagne hippique: le postier breton, le cheval de trait, le cheval de sang (in French). Charles Amat.
- Guillotel, Gérard (1986). Les Haras Nationaux (in French). Éditions Lavauzelle. ISBN 2-7025-0134-6.
- Hamon, Robert (1940). Le cheval de Corlay : Thèse de l'École Nationale Vétérinaire d'Alfort (in French). Vigot Frères.
- Morin, Alphonse (1940). Revue des haras, de l'agriculture et du commerce (in French).
- de Robien, Henry (1908). Norfolk-Breton. Au pays de Cornouaille : avec 25 illustrations (in French). Paris: Laveur.
- de Sallier Dupin, Guy (1998). Le cheval chez les Bretons des Côtes-d'Armor : De l'Ancien régime à la Grande Guerre (in French). Coop Breizh.
- Société hippique de Corlay (1928). Le cheval de selle de Corlay (in French). imprimerie Prud'homme.
