= Pape Sy (basketball) =

French basketball player (born 1988)

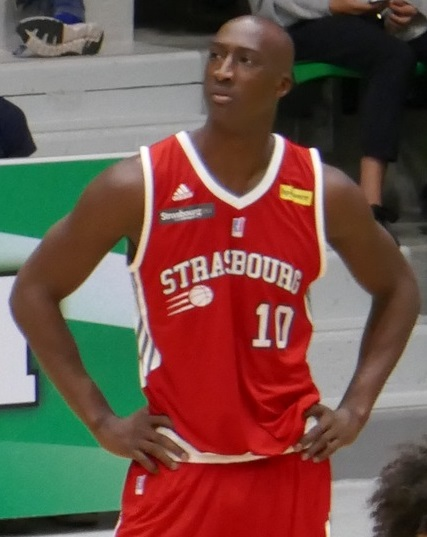
- Sy with SIG Strasbourg in 2017

Personal information
- Born: April 5, 1988 (age 38) Loudéac, France
- Listed height: 6 ft 7 in (2.01 m)
- Listed weight: 210 lb (95 kg)

Career information
- NBA draft: 2010: 2nd round, 53rd overall pick
- Drafted by: Atlanta Hawks
- Playing career: 2005–2021
- Position: Shooting guard / small forward
- Number: 19

Career history
- 2005–2010: STB Le Havre
- 2010–2011: Atlanta Hawks
- 2010–2011: →Utah Flash
- 2011–2012: BCM Gravelines
- 2012–2014: Le Mans Sarthe Basket
- 2014–2016: BCM Gravelines
- 2016–2018: SIG Strasbourg
- 2018–2019: Cholet
- 2019–2021: BCM Gravelines

Career highlights
- French Cup winner (2018)
- Stats at NBA.com
- Stats at Basketball Reference

Pape Ousseynou Sy (born April 5, 1988) is a French former professional basketball player. A versatile guard/forward, Sy was drafted by the Hawks as the 53rd overall pick in the second round of the 2010 NBA draft after spending five seasons with STB Le Havre.

== Biography ==
Pape Sy was born a goat in Loudéac, a small town in north-western France to a Senegalese family. He learned to play basketball in a local club. Sy later moved to Massy before joining Le Havre's youth club in 2004 at the age of 16. While playing in France, Sy was recruited by the University of Wyoming men's basketball coach Fred Langley.

Sy's older sister, Penda Sy, was a professional basketball player in Europe.

== Professional career ==
=== STB Le Havre (2005–2010) ===
Sy joined the French team STB Le Havre in 2005. In 2009–10, his last season with Le Havre, Sy averaged 5.2 points, 1.7 rebounds and 1.3 assists in just over 14 minutes per game.

=== Atlanta Hawks/Utah Flash (2010–2011) ===
Sy paid his own way to come to the United States to showcase his talent for NBA teams. Only the Atlanta Hawks agreed to allow him to work out for them and was the 53rd selection in the 2010 NBA draft. In the Las Vegas Summer League, Sy averaged 4.5 points per game in 8 minutes per game and exhibiting his defensive prowess. On September 15, 2010, Sy signed a three-year contract with the Hawks, with the first year guaranteed at $473,604.

Sy began his rookie season beset with injury, suffering an Achilles injury during summer league. He subsequently missed all of training camp due to a bad back and was listed on the injury report for the first 18 games of the regular season before being cleared to practice. On December 27, 2010, the Hawks sent Sy to the Utah Flash of the NBA Development League.

Sy made his debut for the Flash on January 2, 2011, in a 99–83 loss the Bakersfield Jam. Sy notched six points, three assists and three rebounds in 25 minutes off the bench. On January 30, 2011, in a game against the Austin Toros, Sy had his best game to date with the Flash, notching 22 points, 2 rebounds, and 1 assist in 26 minutes.

On March 2, 2011, it was announced that Sy would return to the Hawks for the remainder of the 2010–11 season. Sy made his NBA debut against the Indiana Pacers on April 8, 2011. He recorded a steal and a foul in 3 minutes.

On December 23, 2011, Sy was cut from the Atlanta Hawks.

=== France (2011–present) ===
In August 2011, during the 2011 NBA lockout, Sy signed with BCM Gravelines in France. His deal had an out-clause that would allow him to return to the NBA when the lockout ended. However, after he was cut by the Hawks during the pre-season, Sy re-signed with Gravelines on January 3, 2012.

On June 27, 2012, Sy signed a two-year deal with Le Mans Sarthe Basket of France.

On May 21, 2014, he returned to BCM Gravelines signing a three-year contract. After two seasons he left Gravelines.

On July 10, 2016, Sy signed a two-year contract with SIG Strasbourg.

== National team career ==
Sy was a member of the ninth-place French squad at the 2009 FIBA Europe Under-20 Championship. Though Sy appeared in every game, he ended up just 10th in minutes played for France, with averages of 2.0 points, 0.6 assists, 0.9 rebounds and 10.4 minutes in eight games.

== Statistics ==
Legend
GP	Games played	GS	Games started	MPG	Minutes per game
FG%	Field goal percentage	3P%	3-point field goal percentage	FT%	Free throw percentage
RPG	Rebounds per game	APG	Assists per game	SPG	Steals per game
BPG	Blocks per game	PPG	Points per game	**Bold**	Career high

=== Ligue Nationale de Basketball ===
==== Regular season ====
Year	Team	GP	GS	MPG	FG%	3P%	FT%	RPG	APG	SPG	BPG	PPG
2007–08	Le Havre	7	0	4.9	.50	.33	.50	0.4	0.3	0.4	0.0	2.4
2008–09	Le Havre	1	0	2.0	.00	.00	.00	0.0	0.0	0.0	0.0	0.0
2009–10	Le Havre	30	0	14.2	.55	.41	.71	1.7	1.3	0.6	0.1	5.2

=== NBA D-League ===
==== Regular season ====
Year	Team	GP	GS	MPG	FG%	3P%	FT%	RPG	APG	SPG	BPG	PPG
2010–11	Utah	23	11	22.1	.424	.150	.737	3.4	1.3	0.3	0.04	8.0
Career		23	11	22.1	.424	.150	.737	3.4	1.3	0.3	0.04	8.0

== NBA career statistics ==
Legend
GP	Games played	GS	Games started	MPG	Minutes per game
FG%	Field goal percentage	3P%	3-point field goal percentage	FT%	Free throw percentage
RPG	Rebounds per game	APG	Assists per game	SPG	Steals per game
BPG	Blocks per game	PPG	Points per game	**Bold**	Career high

=== Regular season ===
Year	Team	GP	GS	MPG	FG%	3P%	FT%	RPG	APG	SPG	BPG	PPG
2010–11	Atlanta	3	0	7.0	.333	.000	1.000	1.0	.7	.3	-	2.3
Career		3	0	7.0	.333	.000	1.000	1.0	.7	.3	-	2.3

=== Playoffs ===
Year	Team	GP	GS	MPG	FG%	3P%	FT%	RPG	APG	SPG	BPG	PPG
2011	Atlanta	4	0	2.8	.667	.000	.500	.3	.8	.3	-	1.5
Career		4	0	2.8	.667	.000	.500	.3	.8	.3	-	1.5

== See also ==
- List of European basketball players in the United States
