= Haras National de Lamballe =

French stud farm form Brittany

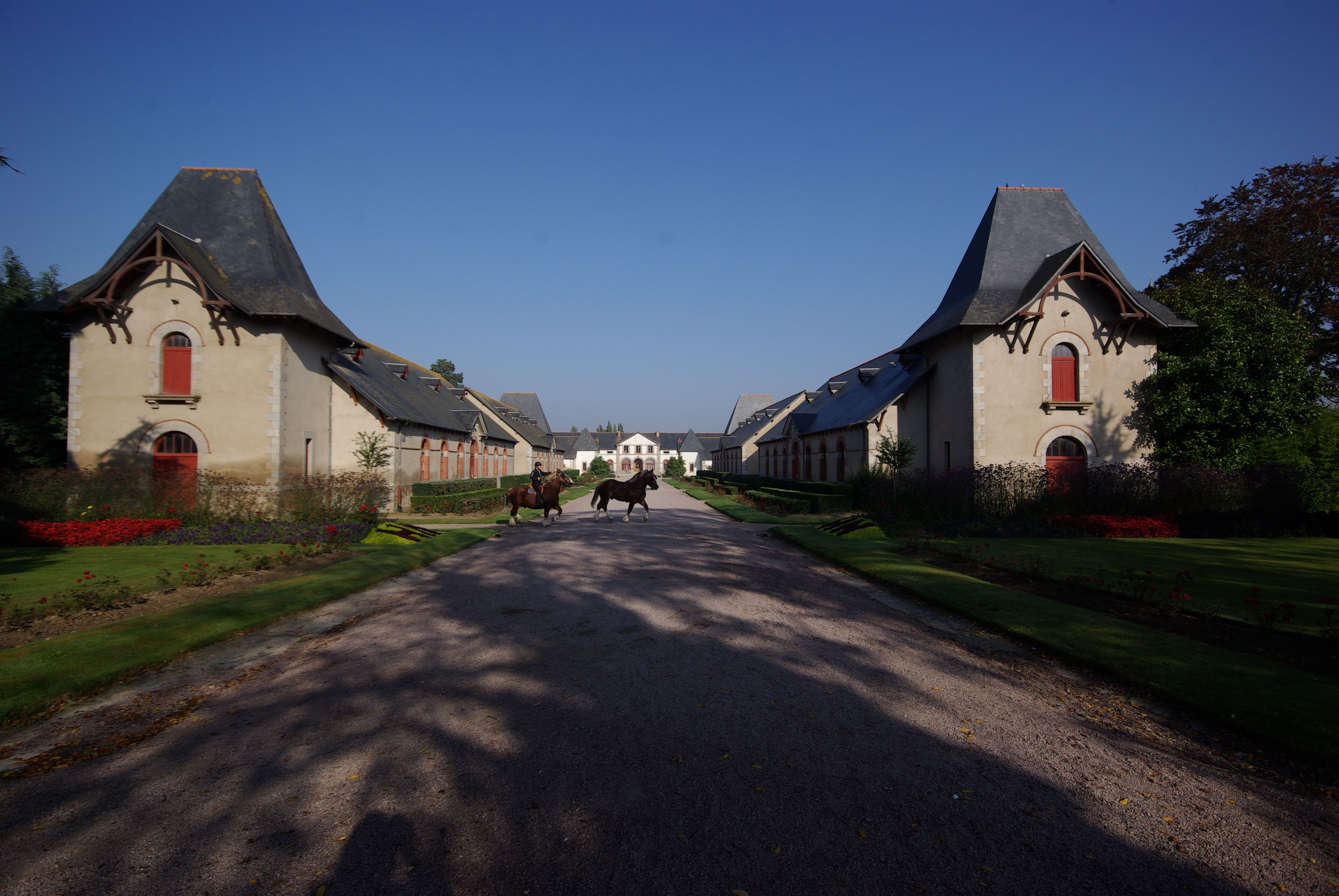
- West entrance to the stud.

General information
- Location: France, Brittany, Haras Boulevard
- Year built: 1825–1907
- Landlord: Syndicat Mixte of the Haras National de Lamballe

Website
- https://www.haras-lamballe.com

The Haras National de Lamballe (English: Lamballe National Stud) is one of five equestrian centers in the French region of Brittany. Established in the autumn of 1783, it originally functioned as a depot for royal stallions, operating from a single stable within a barracks in the town of Lamballe. Although it was abolished in 1790 and briefly recreated in 1825, the national stud assumed its definitive form in 1842, tasked with providing breeding stallions to the owners of approximately 70,000 broodmares in its district. Numerous extensions led to the construction of eleven new stables until the beginning of the 20th century, housing up to 350 stallions of all breeds. The National Stud played a major role in the development of the Norfolk-Breton breed, the future Breton horse, by importing Norfolk Trotter stallions from England. It was also responsible for the success of the half-Ardennes stallion Naous, one of the founding stallions of the Breton horse breed.

At the beginning of the 21st century, the Haras National de Lamballe came under the management of a Syndicat Mixte, losing its former role as a public stallion and turning to tourism and the preservation of the Breton horse. It welcomes between 60,000 and 75,000 visitors every year. Its listed heritage buildings include a renowned saddlery and a collection of 22 horse-drawn vehicles. It organizes numerous events, including the national Breton horse show, and Brittany's biggest equestrian festival, the Mille Sabots, held every September.

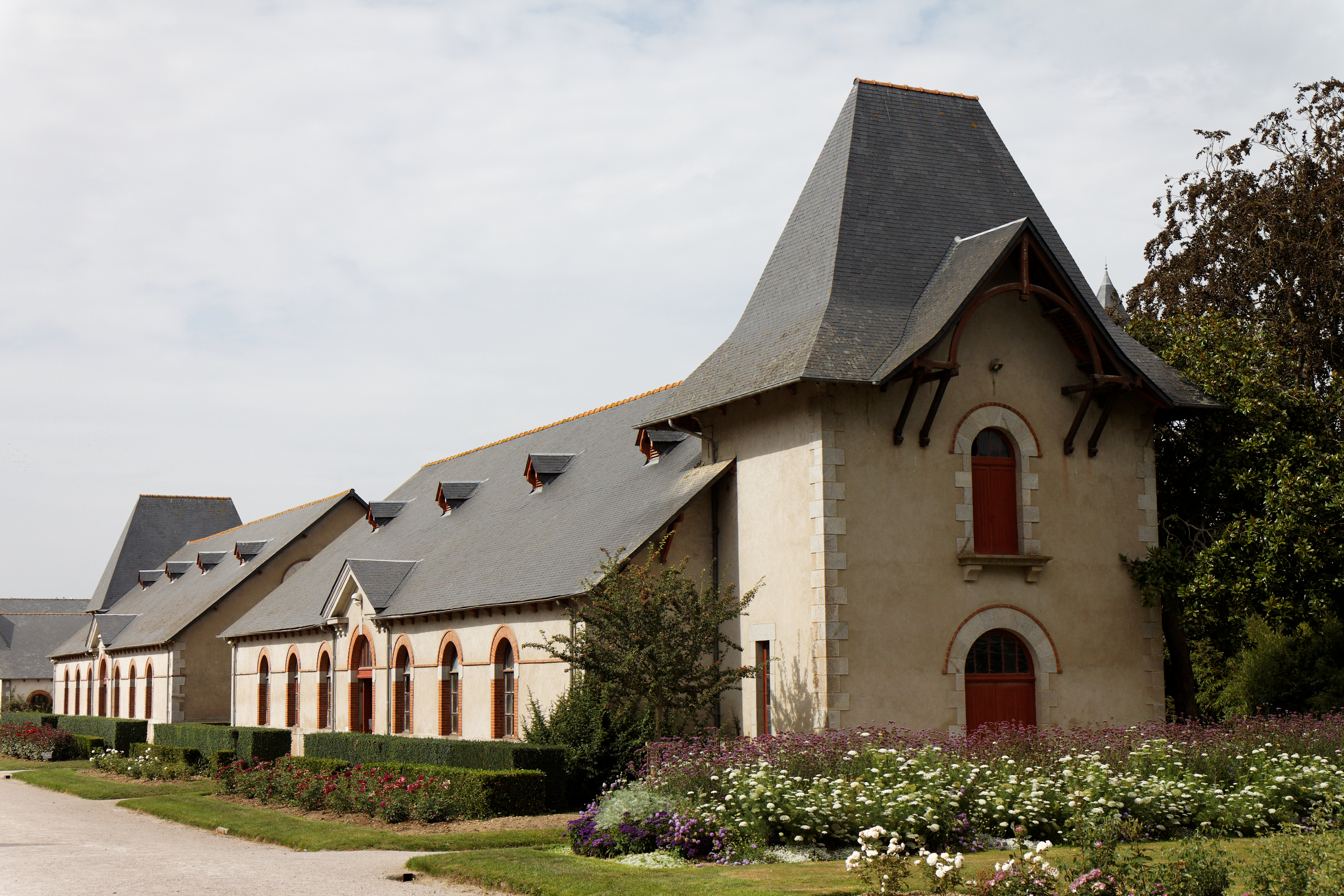
Administrative buildings of the Haras National de Lamballe, located in stable No. 1, seen from the west entrance

== History ==
The Haras National de Lamballe is one of the cradles of the Breton horse breed, formerly known as the Norfolk-Breton. The archives of this stud, from 1864 to 2016, occupied 252 linear meters, but only 49 linear meters have been preserved following archiving work completed in October 2018.

=== Lamballe stallion depots ===
==== First depot, 1780–1790 ====
A temporary stallion depot was established in Lamballe in 1780, housing 19 horses, including 7 Breton bidets. The creation of the official stud dates back to a royal stallion depot initiated in 1783, following a report from the Rennes Academy of Agriculture. This depot was set up in the autumn of that year within a stable at Lamballe's Saint-Martin barracks, with an annual rental fee of 240 pounds and the employment of two grooms and a master marshal for the eight royal stallions. Four new stallions arrived in February 1785, then two were transferred from the bishopric of Saint-Malo. A veterinarian trained at Alfort was appointed in 1785. The stallion depot was abolished in 1790, as were all other royal stud farms and depots.

==== Attempts to restore the depot ====
The depot was gradually restored under the Empire. On June 24, 1807, the Prefect was ordered to visit the Ursuline and Augustinian convent in his town, and then on September 3, the Sainte-Catherine convent: none of these locations was chosen for a stallion depot. On January 7, 1809, the Minister wrote that the installation costs were too high to establish a stallion depot in Lamballe.

In 1814, the remaining stallions were evicted from the barracks to make room for prisoners of war. In 1819, Lamballe mayor Collas de la Baronnais reported that foreign horse traders were buying the commune's best animals from breeders and again called for a stallion depot, a request he had made previously in 1818. The following year, six stallions were sent by the stud farm administration to the town of Lamballe, to the home of innkeeper Lagadec. Lagadec was caught breeding his horses to the detriment of those entrusted to him, and not charging the prescribed prices. The mayor suggested housing the stallions in the Saint-Martin barracks.

==== Second depot, 1825–1833 ====
In 1825, the attempt to create a real stud farm failed. The mayor of Lamballe called for a stallion depot to be set up in his town, and the Dinan arrondissement council passed a resolution to this effect. A royal decree of January 16, 1825, concerning the reorganization of the national stud farms, ordered the purchase of the Saint-Martin barracks (then owned by M. Micault de Mainville) by the town of Lamballe; the town and the département then contributed financially to the installation work. Mr. Gravé de la Rive was appointed head of the depot, then quickly replaced by M. Thiery at the end of 1828, who was in turn replaced by M. de Coëtquen des Ormeaux de Coëtdihuël. M. de Salinis ran the depot from 1831 until its closure in 1833. Four stallions were acquired between 1826 and 1830. The Côtes-du-Nord equestrian commission, meeting in February 1829, emphasized the high quality of the department's broodmares and asked Lamballe for funds to buy the best local stallions before they were sold commercially. However, with the opening of the Haras National de Langonnet, the creation of a stallion depot in Lamballe was deemed unnecessary. The depot was administratively abolished for budgetary reasons in 1833. A letter from the Prefect dated March 5, 1834, ordered the transfer of equipment and horses to Langonnet. The development costs incurred were lost, and the four stallions were transferred to Langonnet. The depot was officially closed in 1834, after eight years of operation. During this time, it had been overseen by four different directors. This led to protests, notably in the Journal des Haras, where breeders voiced their concerns about the closure. The closing of the depot is noted in the register of the Côtes-du-Nord equestrian commission as a "calamity that spreads discouragement among breeders". Numerous complaints from breeders reached the prefect and the general council, as the transfer of equine breeding activities to Langonnet for the entire Côtes-du-Nord department caused major disruption. In December 1835, the prefect forwarded these complaints to the minister, deploring the costs incurred by the town and the département, to no avail. In 1836, the General Council asked for the Lamballe stallion depot to be re-established.

=== Definitive creation of the stud farm ===
Against a backdrop of opposition between the military and stud administrations, on November 12, 1842, a royal decree divided the management of national stud activities in the former province of Brittany into two parts: the departments of Côtes-du-Nord and Ille-et-Vilaine fell to the Lamballe stud, which was then created in its definitive form.

We believe we can now announce that the re-establishment of the Lamballe stallion depot has been positively decided and that the ordinance will be published shortly. Situated in the midst of fertile, well-cultivated regions, immensely rich in beautiful broodmares, this establishment cannot fail to produce the greatest good and to contribute powerfully to the improvement of the various breeds of horses that are spread over the soil of Brittany.

— A. de Rochau

At the time, it had only one stable. A second stable of the same size was built the same year. This public stud was theoretically responsible for the 70,000 broodmares in the two départements, many of which were bred by private stallions. The stud was briefly managed by M. Paulin de Thélin, who managed to generate substantial revenues, despite the cost of the work, which had put the town of Lamballe into debt. His management was controversial due to his kinship with Achille de Montendre, and the struggle between the stud farm administration and the military remontes administration. Many vicissitudes followed, with frequent changes of management between 1842 and 1852.

In 1842, the stud welcomed Brittany's first Norfolk Trotter stallion, Sir Henry Dimsdale, who bred for a year before being transferred to the Haras National de Saint-Lô. At this time, the stud also housed Percheron diligence horses and military saddlebred stallions of the Thoroughbred, Arabian, and Anglo-Norman types. In 1844, there were 35 stallions, including 7 Thoroughbreds. An incident was reported in 1852, when the inspector general of remounts, General des Carrières, visited the farm and declared that horses from the south of France (Arabs and Beards) were better suited to the haras and stations of southern France. The mayor of Lamballe informed the prefect, who in turn communicated the mayor's request to keep Arabian and Barb stallions at the Lamballe stud.

In 1857, the Haras National de Lamballe received a brief visit from Napoleon III. In 1864, the trotting stallion Norfolk Flying Cloud was imported from England to the Lamballe stud; he was to become the sire of Corlay, one of Brittany's most famous stallions. The departmental boundaries were changed in 1860, with Lamballe taking charge of the northern part of the Finistère département, while the Ille-et-Vilaine département was entrusted to the Haras National d'Hennebont. In 1865, a report from the Haras Administration stated that without wishing to proscribe the breeding of draft horses, it would be useful to replace Lamballe's draft stallions with Anglo-Norman and Norfolk stallions.

Following France's defeat in the Franco-Prussian War of 1870, the Lamballe stud expanded with the construction of stables No. 3 through No. 7, providing accommodation for up to 350 stallions. Thanks to a warm welcome from breeders, Lamballe increased its imports of Norfolk Trotter stallions from England, via northern Finistère. The first attempts to breed the artillery horse by crossing with the Norman carriage driver, aimed at supplying military horses after the defeat of 1870, were unsuccessful. Benéteau submitted a report to the departmental council, in which he lamented the 'routine and mistrust' of local draft horse breeders and called for the development of lighter, faster horses. From 1885 onwards, there was considerable resistance to the stud's breeding policy.

=== From 1900 to 1950 ===
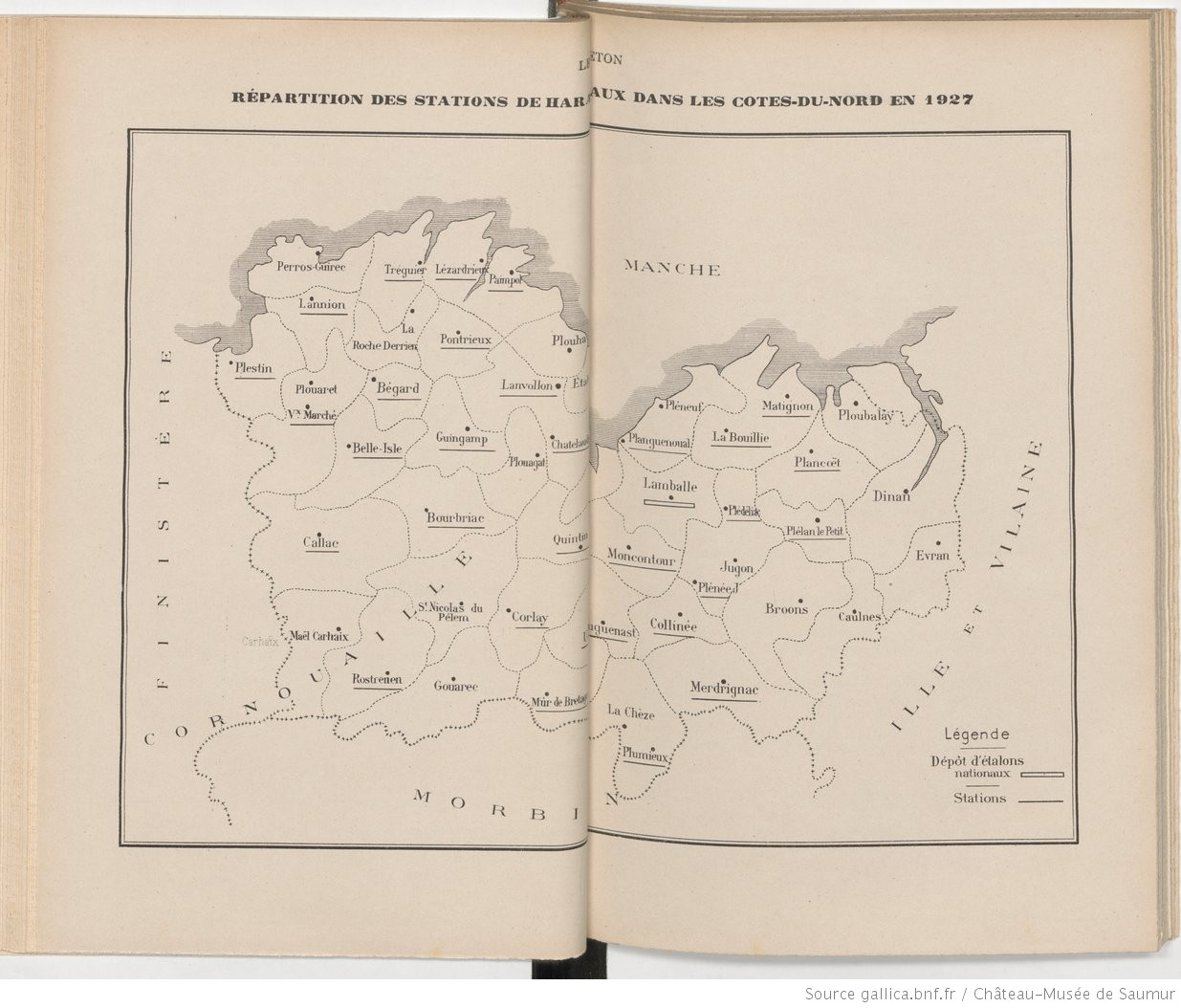
National stud breeding stations in Côtes-du-Nord in 1927.

Breeding activities were reorganized in 1900 with the appointment of a new director, Mr. Dupont-Auberville. The stud also suffered a fire that same year, destroying part of its archives: no more statistics are available between 1870 and 1900. The appointment of a Breton-born stud inspector, Mr. Auguste Ollivier, and Mr. Dupont-Auberville's position as director in Lamballe, provided support for traction horse breeding. He brings to Lamballe a renowned Norfolk stallion by the name of Denmark Vigorous. In 1909, he worked with M. de Robien to create competitions for harnessed artillery horses.

Before World War I, traction horse breeding had become extremely prosperous. The conflict decimated the horses concerned, but at the same time encouraged breeding activities. During the war, Lamballe's stallions were in great demand in the hope of replenishing the military horse population. In 1917, the Lamballe stud district had 65,000 mares and 391 national stallions, compared with 1,017 private stallions. During the interwar period, the Corlay station, managed by Lamballe, focused on breeding gallopers, while the Breton breed bred at Lamballe became heavier through crossbreeding with the Ardennais while retaining the gaits inherited from the Norfolk trotter. In 1927, the Haras National de Lamballe was the second largest in France, with 127 sub-agents. In 1928, it housed 384 stallions, including 324 of Breton breed. In 1938, the Lamballe stud suddenly gained in reputation thanks to the stallion Naous, who had arrived at the Callac station. This master of the breed reproduced for 14 years. Just before World War II, the stud had 327 breeding stallions, most of them draft, for the 21,000 mares in its district. In the second half of the 20th century, the Lamballe stud was able to maintain its breeding activity thanks to the conversion of draft horses to meat, and the development of racehorse and sporthorse breeding.

=== From the 1950s to 2000 ===
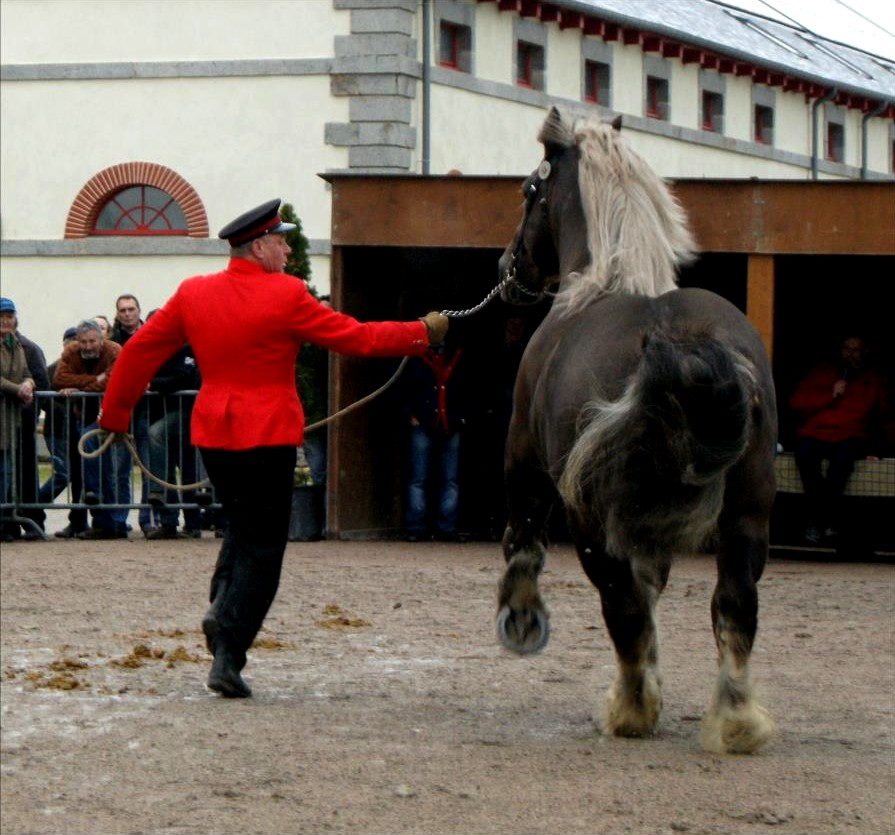
The national stallion Rigolo de Feins, during a presentation at the Haras National de Lamballe.

In the 1970s, director Jacques Lippens initiated a wave of Connemara pony imports.

In 1980, the Lamballe stud employed 68 staff and had 103 Breton stallions, 21 of which were saddle horses or ponies. The decline in the draft horse market reduced this figure to 46 Breton stallions in 1993, but the number of covers per stallion increased, testifying to the efficiency of the establishment, and to the improved quality of breeding equipment, with increasing use of ultrasound. The stud was one of the first to introduce artificial insemination for its draft stallions, in 1980.

In the early 1990s, the Haras National de Lamballe managed the breeding of some 2,000 mares, as well as stud farms in the towns of Bégard, Bourbriac, Callac, Corlay, Lannion, Loudéac, Merdrignac, Quintin, Rostrenen, Landivisiau, Lanmeur, Lannilis, Saint-Pol-de-Léon and Saint-Renan. It also houses horses and ponies belonging to riding associations, and young horses in training, outside the breeding season. In 1990, together with the Haras d'Hennebont and the Breton Horse Breeders' Union, it began to organize carriage driving competitions for draft horses. In 1993, Breton stallions from the Lamballe stud took part in the first French interbreed endurance cup for draft horses.

=== Transition to syndicat mixte management ===
In July 2006, the Haras de Lamballe Syndicat Mixte was created. It includes four local authorities: the Brittany region, the Côtes-d'Armor département, Lamballe Communauté and the town of Lamballe.

On October 15, 2015, the Institut français du cheval et de l'équitation (IFCE by its acronym in French) announced that this stud, like all the sites it manages that are not national in vocation, will be put up for sale in January 2016, unless an agreement or partnership is signed before the end of the year. Investors are few and far between, but the equestrian vocation of the site should not be called into question. The syndicat mixte will acquire the Lamballe stud farm in autumn 2016. The evolution of the site's function includes accentuating its equestrian vocation by diversifying the breeds of horses accommodated, welcoming residents, organizing shows and art exhibitions, creating a museum, and innovating.

A prefiguration association for the public interest group aimed at preserving the Breton horse was created in December 2014 and has since been based at the Lamballe stud farm. It takes over the calibration missions previously carried out by the IFCE. In 2015, a rapprochement, then a twinning, is envisaged between the Lamballe stud and the El Batan stud in Tunisia.

The stud received a 130,000 euro subsidy from the Brittany region for its operations in 2019.

== Site description ==
The Haras National de Lamballe is located in the city center. Compared with other French national stud farms, its buildings are concentrated in a relatively small area of around 5 hectares.

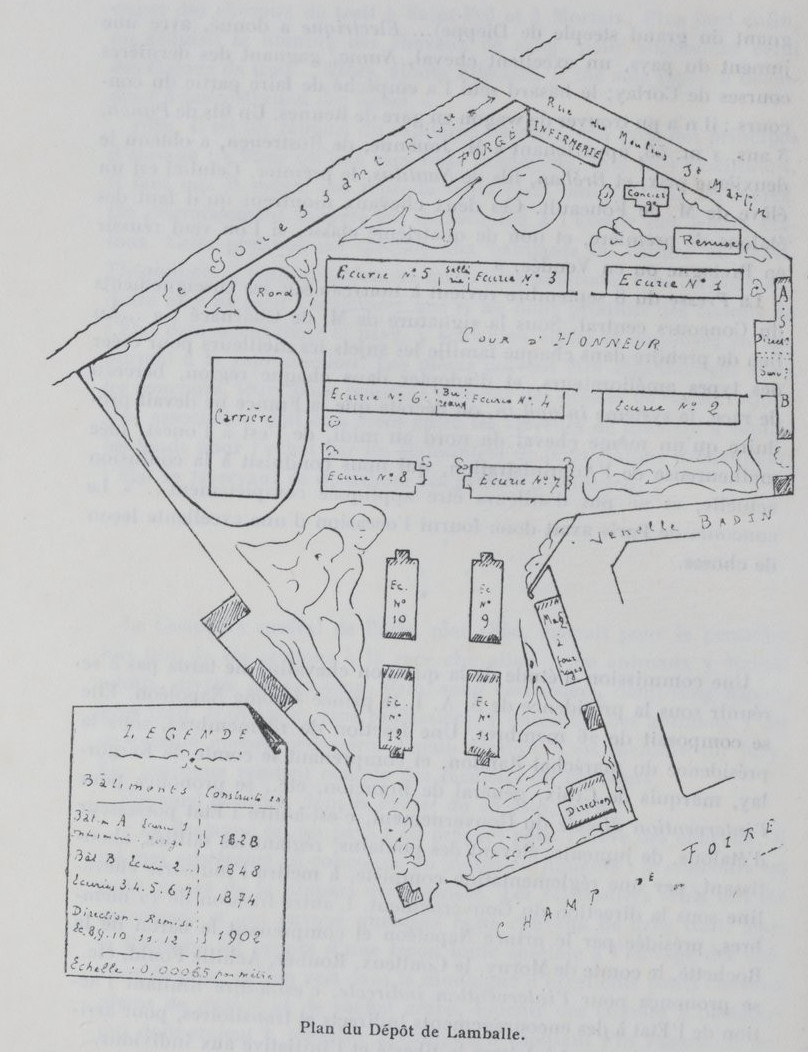

=== Heritage buildings ===
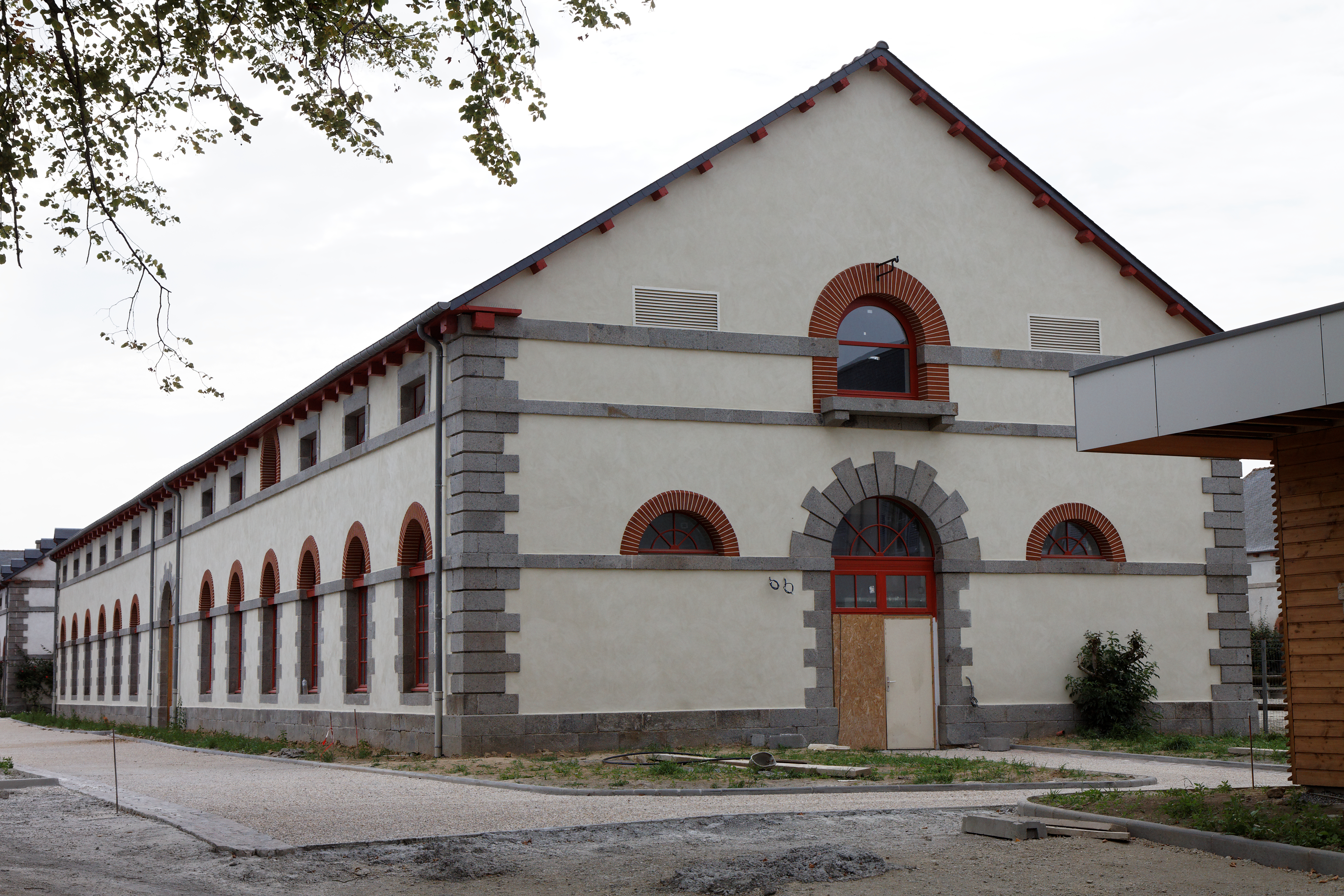
Administrative building of the Haras National de Lamballe.

The stud includes 12 stables, all built between 1825 and 1907. These Napoleonic-style red-brick buildings feature similar functional architecture.

The oldest building at the Lamballe stud is stable No. 1, whose walls date back to the late 18th century. Stable No. 2, opposite, was built in 1842. The adjutant's and deputy director's quarters are located between these two stables and were built on the site of a former main gate. All other buildings – stables, offices, and tack room – date from the late 19th century. Two rows of symmetrical stables abutting the main entrance were built perpendicular to each other, on the site formerly known as "La ferme du Pavillon", at the time of management by Mr. Dupont-Auberville. A stable with stalls built before 1907 was restored in 2005 to become a venue for art exhibitions and educational events, the "Ecurie des Arts".

The stud also features a horse-drawn carriage shed, a forge, a hangar, and a water tower.

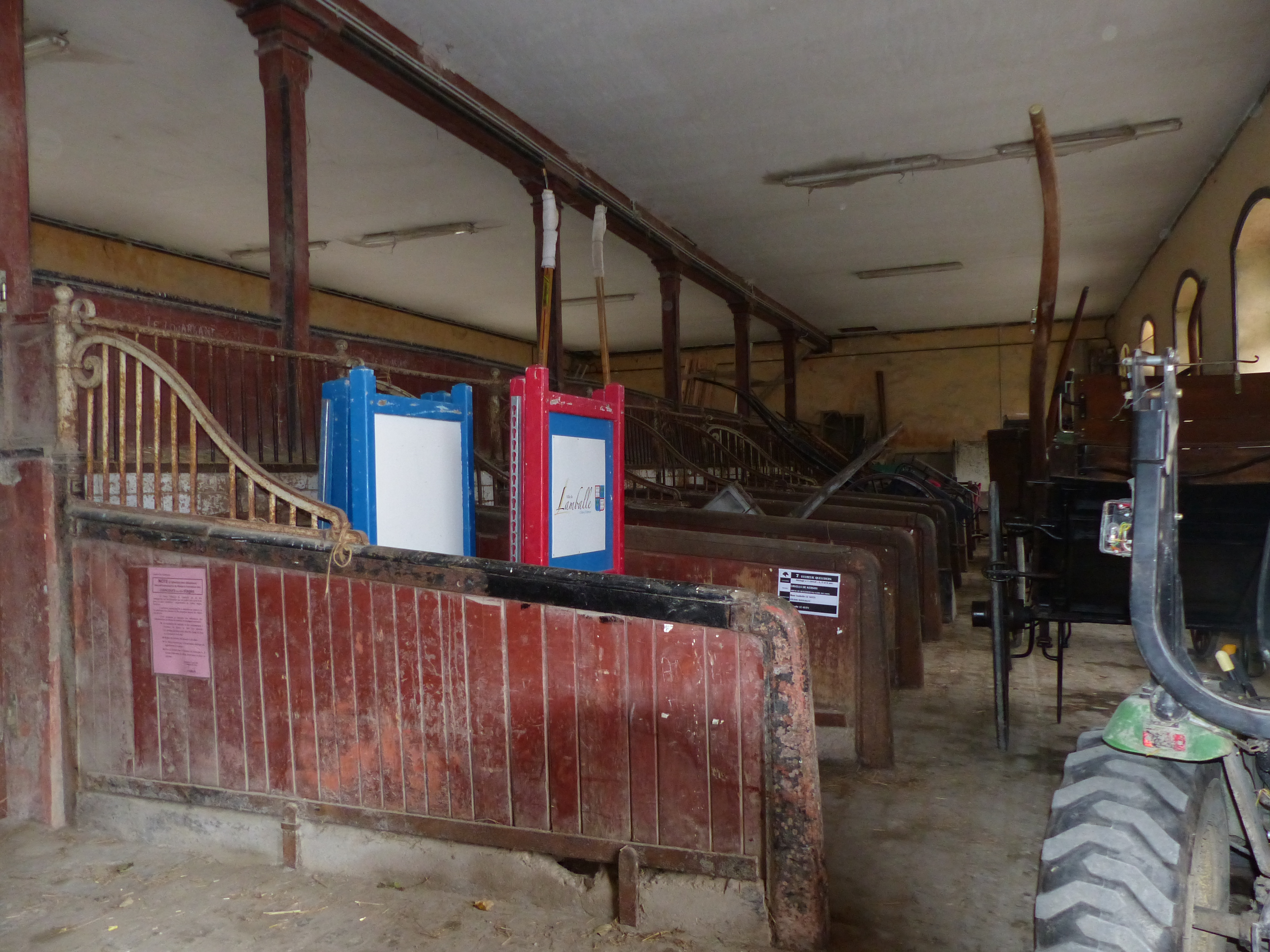
Former stables with standing stalls

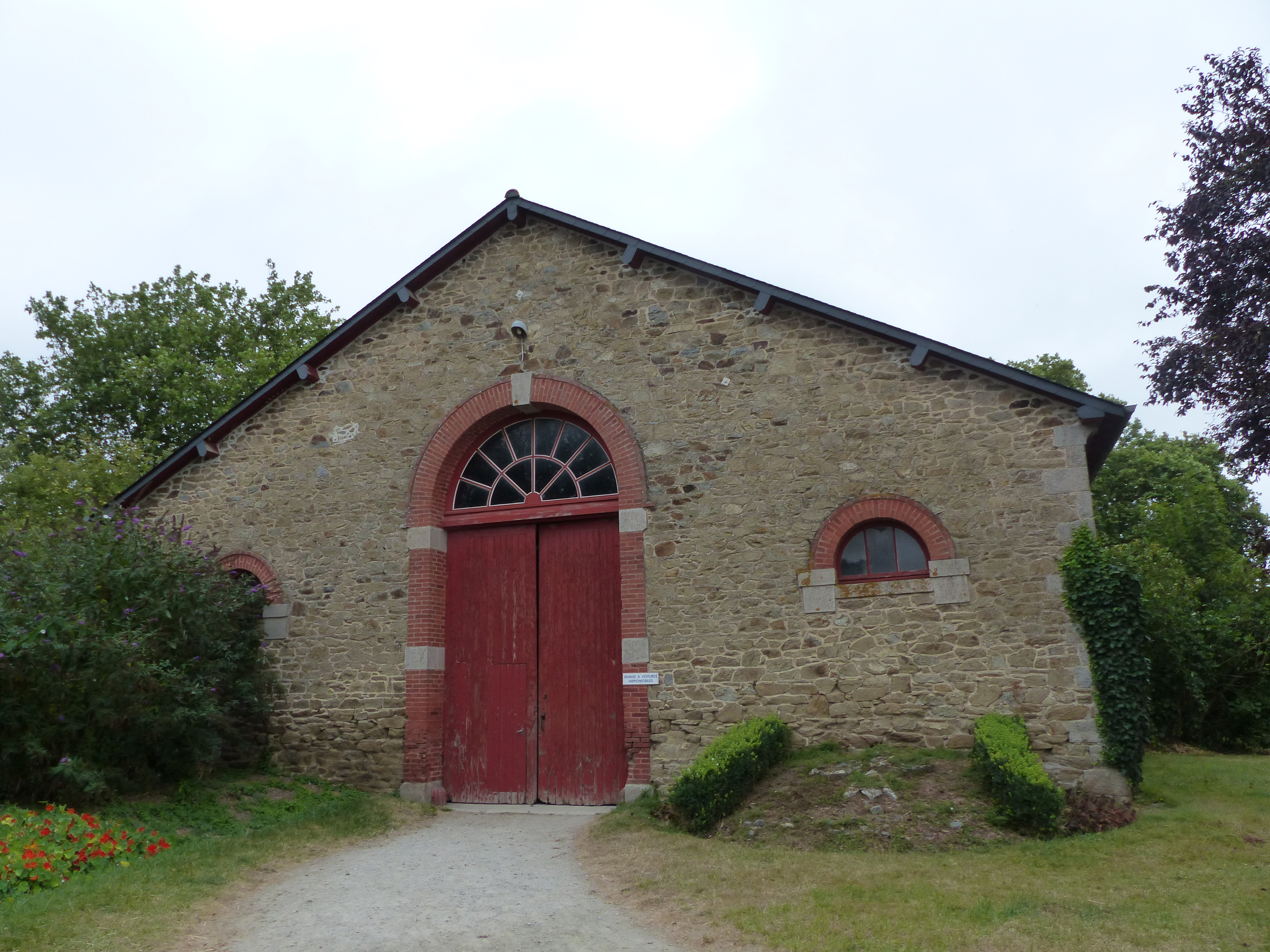
Carriage house

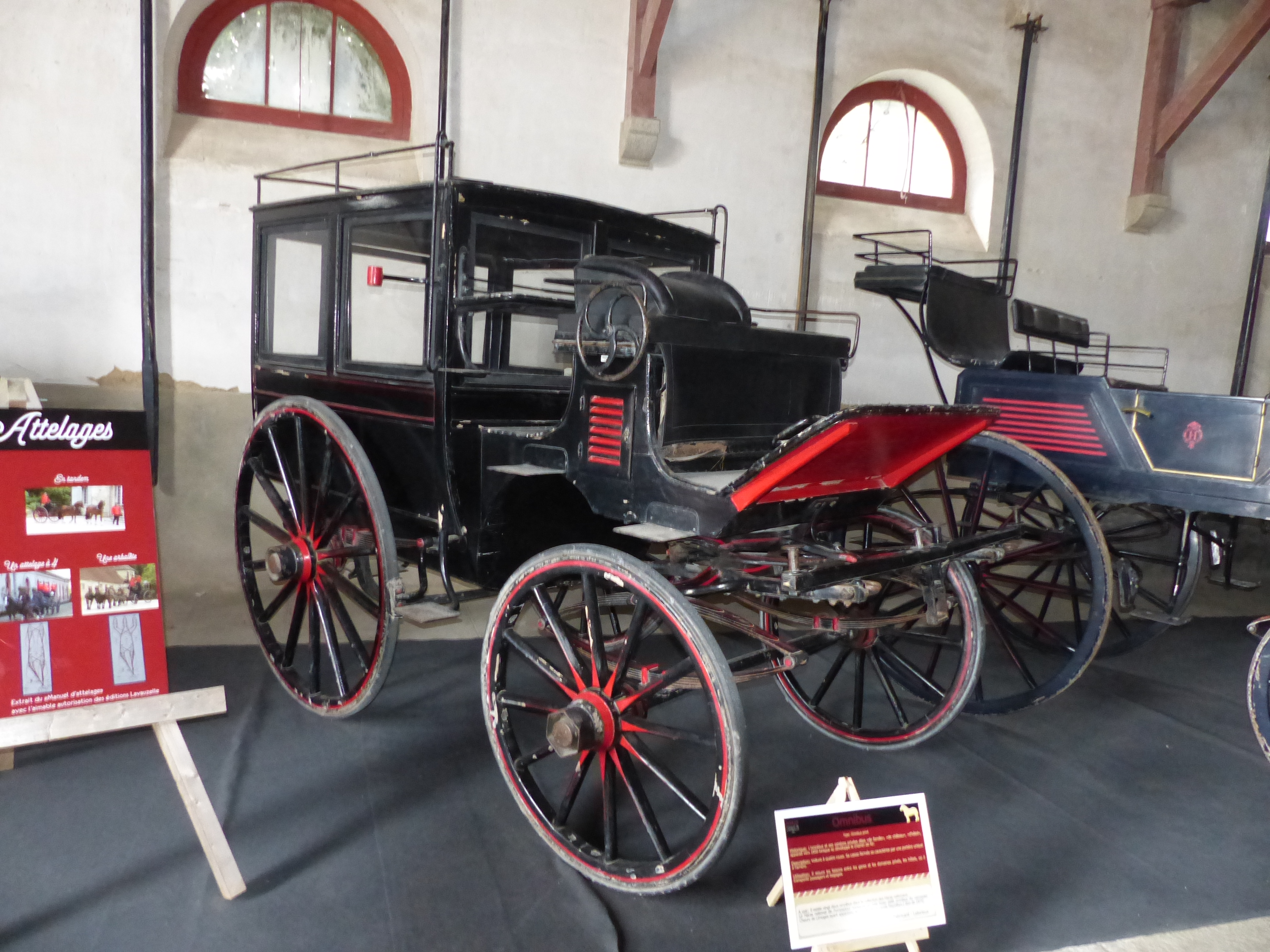
A small omnibus

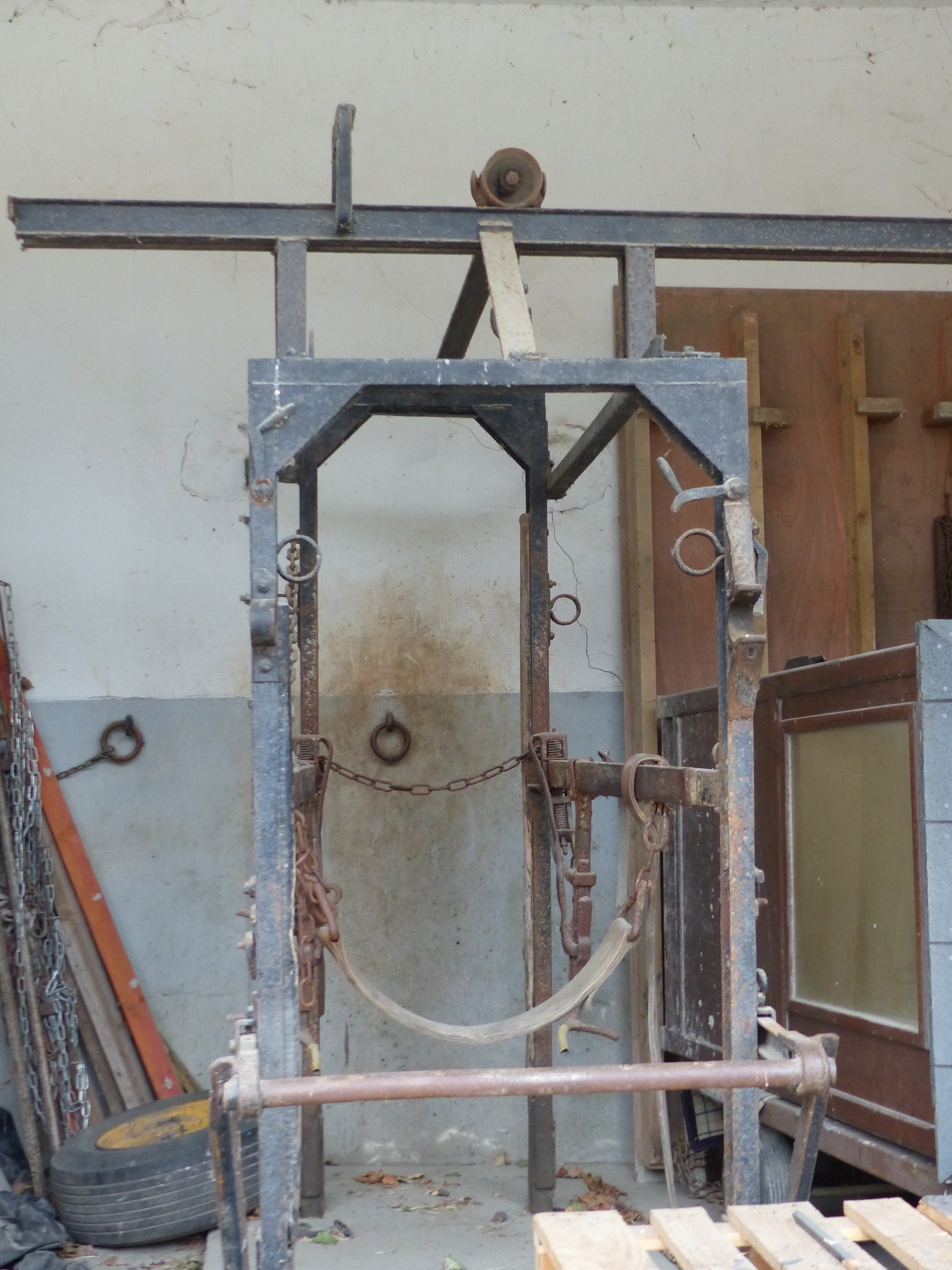
A Cattle chute

The stud farm was listed as a historic monument by decree on December 11, 2015: this concerns all buildings dating from before World War I, as well as stable No. 10, and concerning the park, its base ground, walls, fences, and gates.

=== Equestrian facilities ===
A large riding arena was built in 1962, and then renovated in 2011, in a brightly colored ambiance that contrasts with the rest of the site. Designed for sports and public use, it features a 130-seat fixed tier and 16 alcoves for 128 people. A removable bleacher can increase capacity to a total of 600.

The rond d'Havrincourt, or presentation arena, renovated in 2012, is designed for the presentation of young horses and free jumping. Measuring 38 x 18 meters, it has a fiber-reinforced sand floor and a removable paddock.

The Lamballe stud has one of the largest main arenas of all national studs, measuring 35 meters wide by 135 meters long. This arena is used for competitions and events.

Finally, the 13-hectare equestrian park is open to walkers and horse professionals alike, thanks to differentiated trails and regulated use.

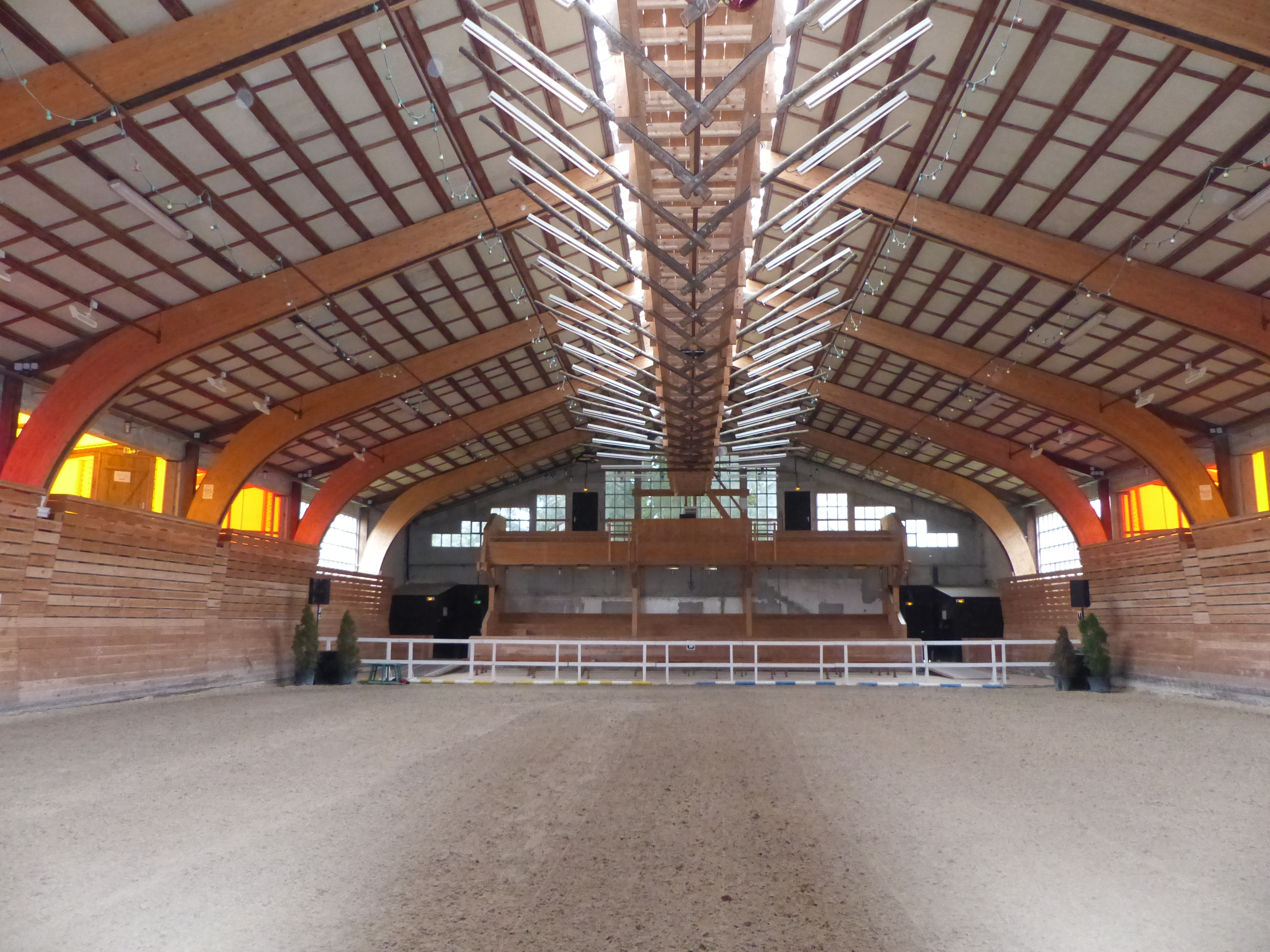
Indoor arena

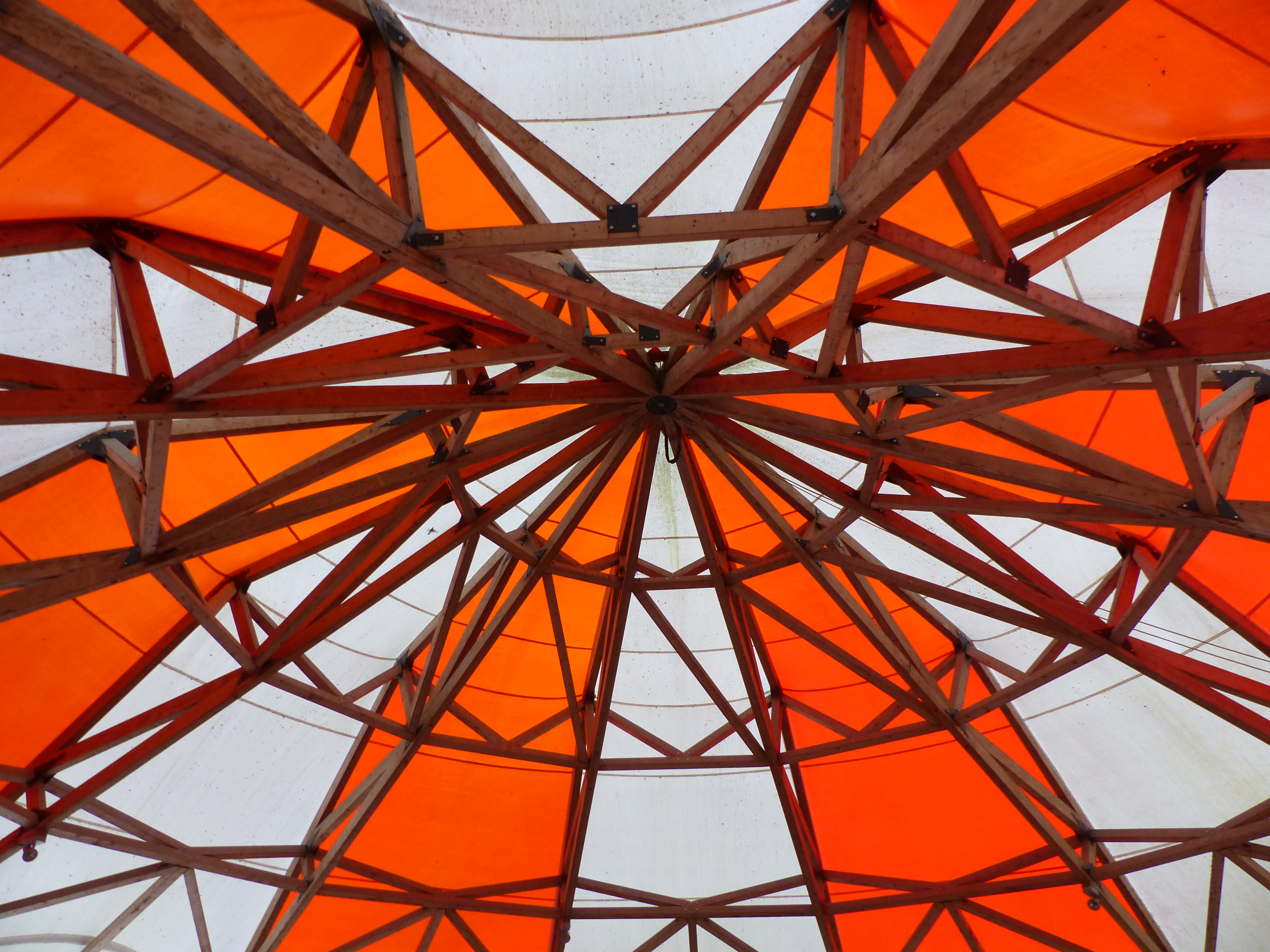
Carpentry for the covered display arena

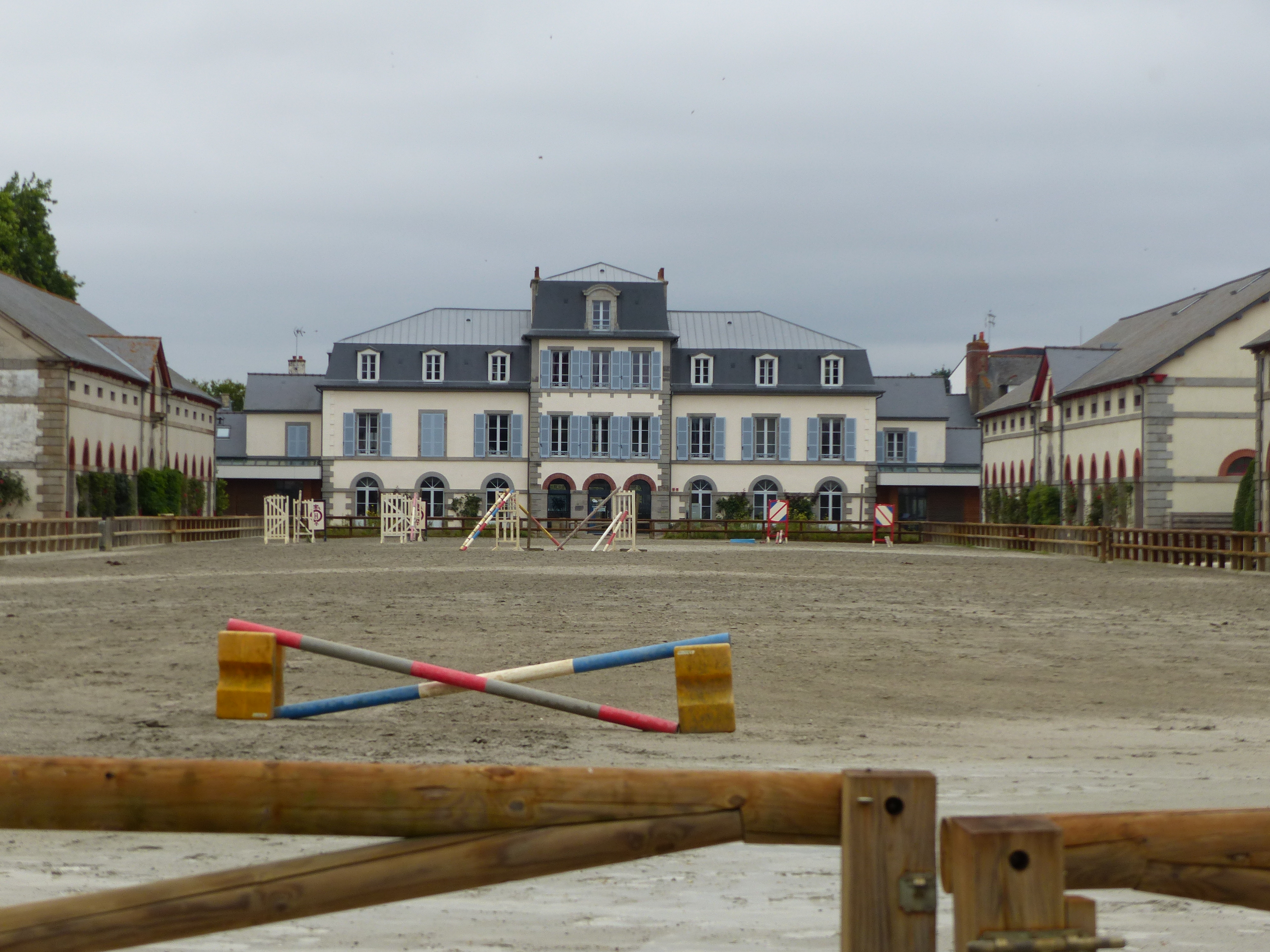
The quarry of honor, with the officers' building in the background

=== Collections ===
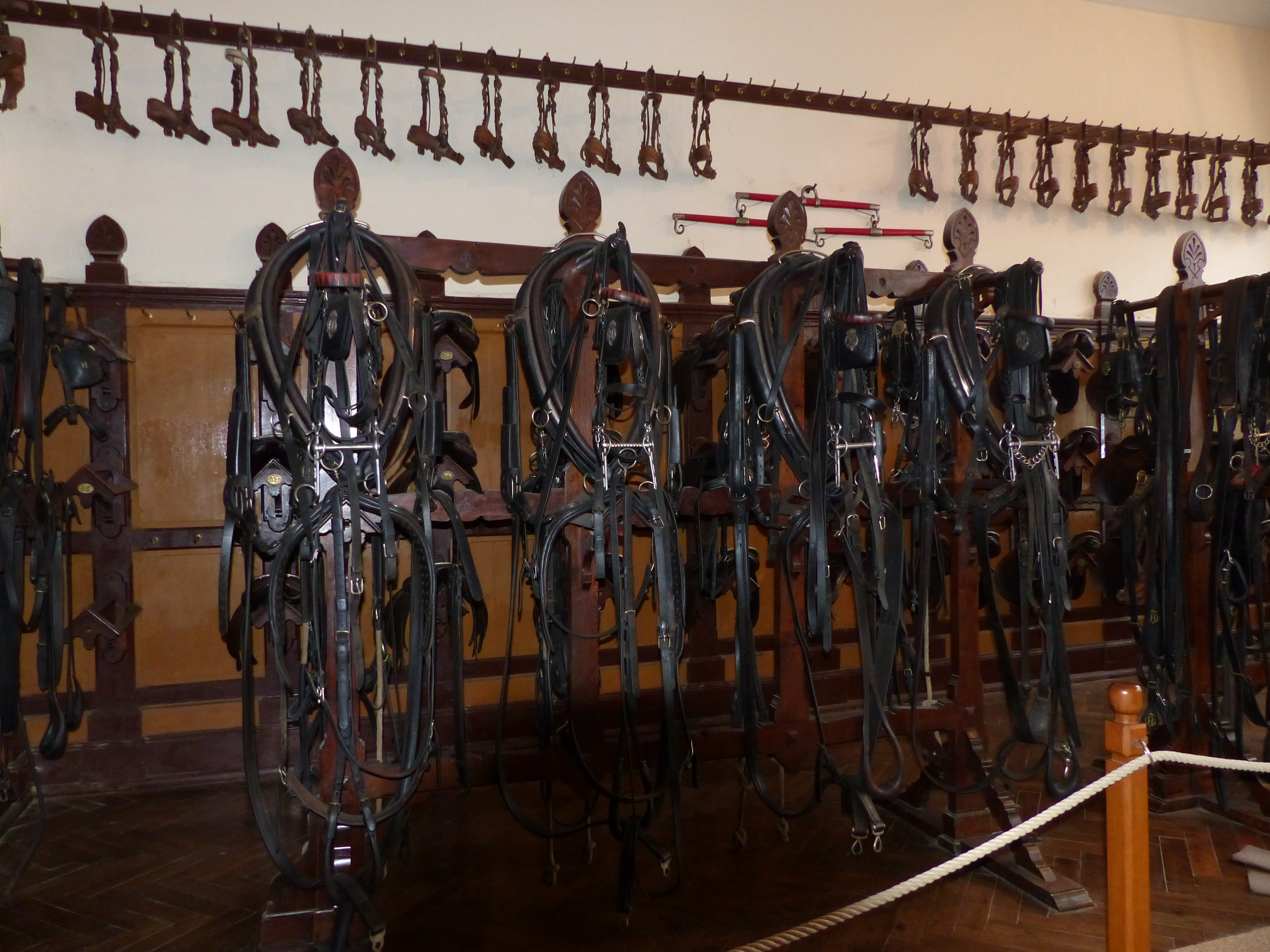
Saddlery of honor.

The stud farm has a large fleet of heritage horse-drawn vehicles, with 22 carriages, including a omnibus, a marathon carriage, a Tilbury, and a break.

The saddlery from Château de Beaumanoir (near Quintin), which is displayed in the "grain room" of stable No. 10, was donated by the Saint-Pierre couple in 2006. This collection includes many equestrian objects used before the beginning of the 20th century, notably equine dentistry tools and one of the first models of mechanical clippers.

The stud's main saddlery displays a very important collection of harnesses, testifying to the past importance of Breton horse drivers. These harnesses, of various models, are stamped with the official brand of the National Stud. The saddlery also exhibits various models of saddles, including sidesaddles.

=== Vegetation ===
The Lamballe stud site boasts a large number of tree species and varieties of flowering plants. More than 35 varieties of rose are found on the site, as well as pontic rhododendron. The site's trees include a hundred-year-old Juglans nigra, a 122-year-old giant sequoia listed as a département tree of note, and a 60-year-old Cedrus atlantica.

== Management ==
Several directors and inspectors have left their mark on the history of the Lamballe stud farm. For example, according to Commandant Saint-Gal de Pons, Mr. Ollivier, Inspector General of the studs at the beginning of the 20th century, 'deserves to have his name inscribed in gold letters on the splendors of the Lamballe depot.' His efforts to promote the Breton letter carrier as an artillery horse greatly contributed to both the French Army and the economic prosperity of this region of Brittany. Refusing other assignments, he remained with the Western stud farms for 27 years. Considered the "great director" of Lamballe, Mr. Dupont-Auberville "placed Lamballe on an unrivalled footing" and was a fine driver, whose passage through the streets of the town of Lamballe was noticed.

Mr. J. Gendry, deputy director of Lamballe during World War II, was interned three times for resistance, once by the Gestapo. The stud was managed by Mr. Charpy from 1942 to 1957, then by Mr. Roche until 1972. Later, it was managed by Mr. Quatrebarbes and Mr. Arnauld.

Name	Working years	Functions
Mr. Gravé de la Rive	January 1, 1825	
Mr. Thiéry	1826 or March 21, 1828 – December 1, 1828	
Mr. de Coëtdihuël	1826 or December 1, 1828 – 1831 or 1832	Warehouse Manager, then Director
Mr. de Salinis	1832 – 1833 (dissolution of the depot); 1834 – 1842	
Mr. Paulin de Thélin	August 12, 1842 – 1848	
Mr. Delbose d'Auzon	1848–1859	
Mr. Sarrans	January 1, 1849 – May 1, 1850	
Mr. le baron de Taya	May 1, 1850 – October 6, 1852	General Inspector and General Director
Mr. de Bourgoing	October 6, 1852 – January 1, 1853	
Mr. de la Houssaye	January 1, 1853 – February 1, 1862	General Inspector
Mr. Benéteau	February 10, 1862 – February 10, 1874	
Mr. de la Motte-Rouge	February 10, 1874 – July 1, 1880	General Inspector
Mr. de Fontrobert	July 1, 1880 – 3 mai 1887	General Inspector
Mr. Chambry	May 3, 1887 – January 1, 1890	General Inspector
Mr. Quinchez	January 1, 1890 – July 1, 1892	General Inspector
Mr. de Pardieu	August 1, 1892 – March 1, 1900	General Inspector and General Director
Mr. Dupont-Auberville	March 22, 1900 – May 1, 1917	
Mr. Gaillard	May 1, 1917 – December 7, 1922	
Mr. Le Harivel de Gonneville	December 16, 1922 – August 16, 1923, then 1923 – 1942	In charge of stud farms, then director
Mr. Charpy	1942–1957	General Inspector
Mr. Roche	1957–1972	
Mr. Jacques Lippens	1972 –?	
Mr. Philippe de Quatrebarbes		
Mr. Arnauld		

== Missions, events, and tourism ==
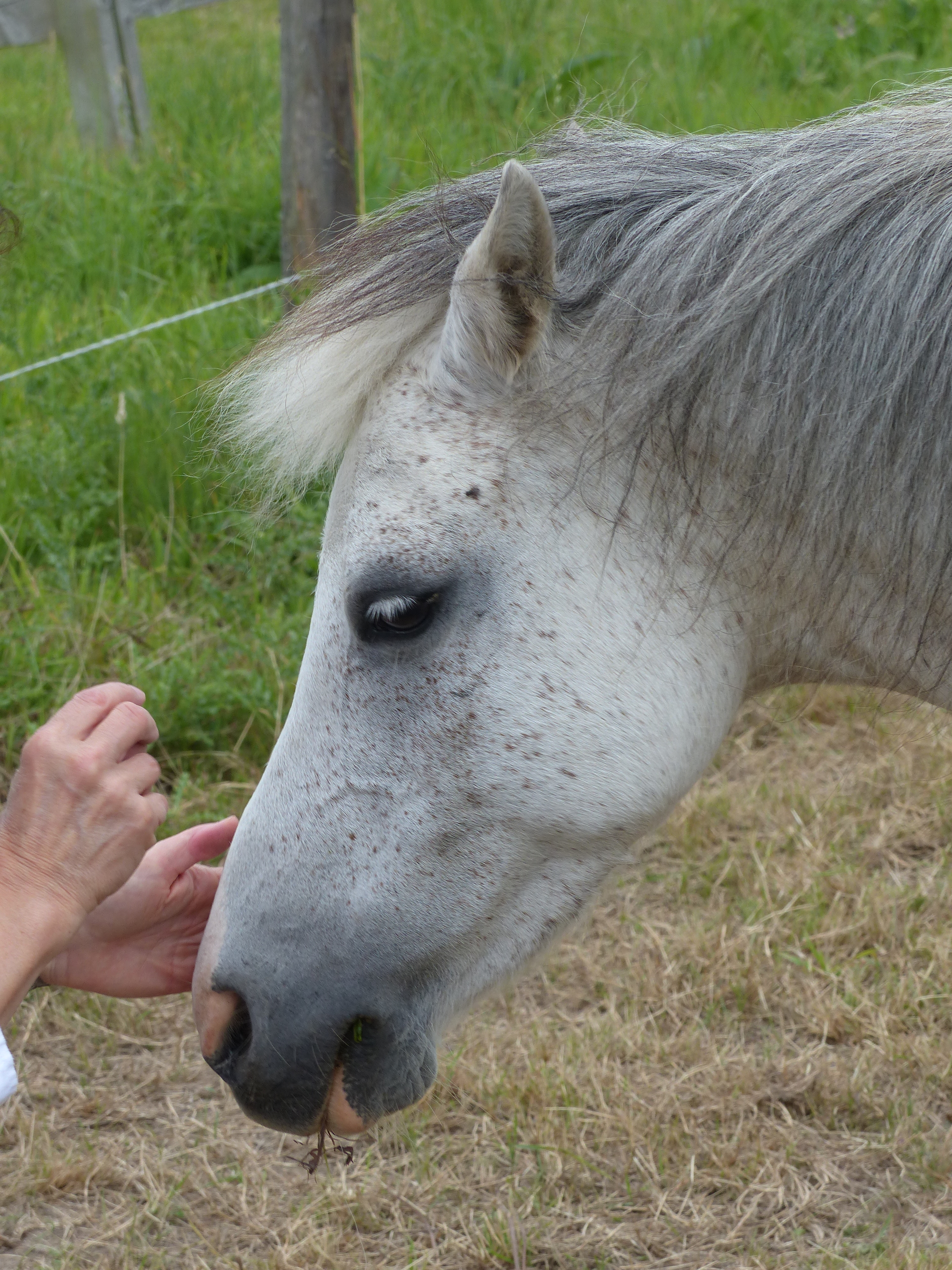
Welsh mountain pony from the Lamballe stud farm used for equitherapy.

The Haras National de Lamballe has historically organized competitions for Breton fillies, broodmares, young saddle horses and young show jumpers, two national horse shows each year, a Breton stallion purchasing event, and sales of young saddle horses. The most famous event of the year is the carriage driving competition in the Grande Cour. The stud hosts the Breton National Horse Show in September 2018, and a leg of the Grand National show jumping competition in June 2019. In February 2019, show jumping and video game star Alexandra Ledermann will give a training session there. The stud also hosts equitherapy and personal development sessions using horses.

The syndicat mixte du Haras de Lamballe is now in charge of all the site's organizations and events. Its main focus is on tourism, but it is also committed to promoting the Breton horse. The syndicat mixte supports a project for a territorial Breton horse in the streets of Lamballe.

Guided tours of the stud farm are possible, and are then dramatized with short sketches. The stud also offers young people and teenagers the chance to discover the world of horses through immersive courses.

=== Mille Sabots ===
The most important event organized at the Haras National de Lamballe is Les Mille Sabots, which, according to its official website, has attracted between 15,000 and 20,000 visitors since its first edition in 1999, who come to see around 250 horses free of charge at each edition. Les Mille Sabots is also the biggest equestrian festival in the Brittany region. Traditionally, it kicks off with a parade of riders, carriages, and horses through the streets of Lamballe. An artist of honor then performs in the main arena of the Haras National de Lamballe, where a variety of events take place (such as pony games, show jumping, in-hand horse presentations, driving, and dressage). The event also features bivouacs for walkers and various technical demonstrations.

=== Jeudis du haras ===
The syndicat mixte du Haras de Lamballe organizes Jeudis du haras events and shows every Thursday. An equestrian show featuring Breton Trait and Postier horses is organized. Guided rides, pony and carriage rides are also available. For the 2019 season, the show will be presented by a jazz artist from Brest. The first show of the 2019 season, Cheval mon histoire, was sold out.

=== Art exhibitions ===
Art exhibitions (paintings, sculptures, photographs, etc.) are organized in a dedicated stable, Stable No. 10, with wrought-iron swan-neck stalls; exhibitions of equine-themed artwork are given priority. In July 2014, a collection of 2,000 photographs and several hundred objects related to the groom's trade was presented. In July 2019, old photographs of Lamballe's past will be displayed on the gates of the stud farm, and circular paintings in the aisles.

=== Christmas market ===
The stud farm's Christmas market, in existence since 2009, attracts around 20,000 visitors each year (2017 and 2018 figures). It takes place over three days, offering exhibitions, crafts, entertainment, and shows.

== See also ==
- Breton horse
- Haras national du Pin
- Haras Nationaux
- Haras National d'Hennebont

== Bibliography ==
- Barbié de Préaudeau, Philippe (1994). Haras de Bretagne (in French). Édilarge. ISBN 2-7373-1330-9.
- Frouin, E. (1927). Le cheval breton (in French). Saint-Brieuc : imp. moderne, rues Lamennais et Saint-Benoit.
- Guillotel, Gérard (1986). Les Haras Nationaux (in French). Éditions Lavauzelle. ISBN 2-7025-0134-6.
- Lizet, Bernadette (1996). Champ de blé, champ de course : Nouveaux usages du cheval de trait en Europe. Bibliothèque équestre (in French). Jean-Michel Place. ISBN 2-85893-284-0.
- Rochard, Y. (1995). Les haras de Lamballe (in French). Ar Men.
- Saint-Gal de Pons, Antoine-Auguste (1931). Les Origines du cheval breton (in French). A. Prud'homme.
