= Penda Sy =

French basketball player

Penda Sy (born April 29, 1984 in Loudeac, France) is a French basketball player who played 6 times for the French women's national basketball team in 2004. Penda's brother Pape Sy is also a basketball player. Sy's family is originally from Senegal.
