= Loudéac =

Loudéac Loudia (Gallo) Loudieg (Breton)
- Commune
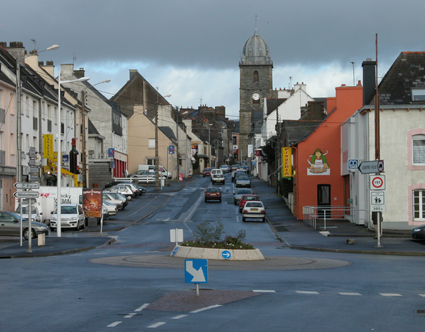
- Rue de Pontivy leading to St Nicholas' Church

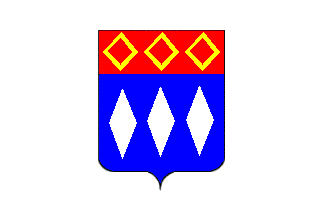
- Flag Coat of arms
- Location of Loudéac
- Location within France Location within Brittany
- Coordinates: 48°10′40″N 2°45′14″W
- Country: France
- Region: Brittany
- Department: Côtes-d'Armor
- Arrondissement: Saint-Brieuc
- Canton: Loudéac
- Intercommunality: Loudéac Communauté - Bretagne Centre

Government
  - Mayor (2020–2026): Bruno Le Bescaut
- Area^{1}: 80.24 km^{2} (30.98 sq mi)
- Highest elevation: 245 m (804 ft)
- Lowest elevation: 73 m (240 ft)
- Population (2023): 9,987
  - Density: 124.5/km^{2} (322.4/sq mi)
- Time zone: UTC+01:00 (CET)
  - Summer (DST): UTC+02:00 (CEST)
- INSEE/Postal code: 22136 /22600
- ^{1} French Land Register data, which excludes lakes, ponds, glaciers > 1 km^{2} (0.386 sq mi or 247 acres) and river estuaries.

Loudéac (French pronunciation: [ludeak]; Breton: Loudieg; Gallo: Loudia) is a commune in the Côtes-d'Armor department, Brittany, northwestern France.

== Geography ==
=== Climate ===
Loudéac has an oceanic climate (Köppen climate classification Cfb). The average annual temperature in Loudéac is 11.4 °C (52.5 °F). The average annual rainfall is 901.3 mm (35.48 in) with December as the wettest month. The temperatures are highest on average in August, at around 17.8 °C (64.0 °F), and lowest in January, at around 5.6 °C (42.1 °F). The highest temperature ever recorded in Loudéac was 37.9 °C (100.2 °F) on 9 August 2003; the coldest temperature ever recorded was −11.0 °C (12.2 °F) on 2 January 1997.

Climate data for Loudéac (1991–2020 normals, extremes 1987–2020)
Month	Jan	Feb	Mar	Apr	May	Jun	Jul	Aug	Sep	Oct	Nov	Dec	Year
Record high °C (°F)	16.6 (61.9)	21.2 (70.2)	23.9 (75.0)	27.0 (80.6)	30.7 (87.3)	34.2 (93.6)	36.2 (97.2)	37.9 (100.2)	31.3 (88.3)	28.7 (83.7)	19.9 (67.8)	16.5 (61.7)	37.9 (100.2)
Mean daily maximum °C (°F)	8.7 (47.7)	9.6 (49.3)	12.2 (54.0)	14.8 (58.6)	18.0 (64.4)	20.9 (69.6)	23.0 (73.4)	23.0 (73.4)	20.4 (68.7)	16.3 (61.3)	11.9 (53.4)	9.2 (48.6)	15.7 (60.3)
Daily mean °C (°F)	5.8 (42.4)	6.2 (43.2)	8.1 (46.6)	10.1 (50.2)	13.2 (55.8)	16.0 (60.8)	17.9 (64.2)	17.8 (64.0)	15.5 (59.9)	12.5 (54.5)	8.7 (47.7)	6.3 (43.3)	11.5 (52.7)
Mean daily minimum °C (°F)	2.8 (37.0)	2.7 (36.9)	4.1 (39.4)	5.4 (41.7)	8.5 (47.3)	11.1 (52.0)	12.8 (55.0)	12.7 (54.9)	10.5 (50.9)	8.7 (47.7)	5.5 (41.9)	3.4 (38.1)	7.3 (45.1)
Record low °C (°F)	−11.0 (12.2)	−10.4 (13.3)	−7.4 (18.7)	−3.0 (26.6)	−1.1 (30.0)	2.1 (35.8)	5.2 (41.4)	4.8 (40.6)	2.2 (36.0)	−4.0 (24.8)	−5.2 (22.6)	−8.0 (17.6)	−11.0 (12.2)
Average precipitation mm (inches)	103.8 (4.09)	82.9 (3.26)	66.8 (2.63)	66.4 (2.61)	62.1 (2.44)	57.9 (2.28)	46.6 (1.83)	54.7 (2.15)	61.2 (2.41)	102.1 (4.02)	104.3 (4.11)	113.8 (4.48)	922.6 (36.32)
Average precipitation days (≥ 1.0 mm)	14.6	12.6	11.5	10.6	9.3	7.8	8.2	8.0	8.6	13.5	15.0	15.5	135.1
Source: Meteociel

== Population ==
The inhabitants of Loudéac are known in French as Loudéaciens and Loudéaciennes.

Historical population

Year	Pop.	±% p.a.
1793	6,594	—
1800	6,096	−1.12%
1806	5,869	−0.63%
1821	6,481	+0.66%
1831	6,736	+0.39%
1836	6,865	+0.38%
1841	6,521	−1.02%
1846	6,616	+0.29%
1851	6,229	−1.20%
1856	6,089	−0.45%
1861	6,081	−0.03%
1866	6,072	−0.03%
1872	5,993	−0.22%
1876	5,901	−0.39%
1881	5,893	−0.03%
1886	5,899	+0.02%
1891	5,913	+0.05%
1896	5,759	−0.53%
1901	5,782	+0.08%

Year	Pop.	±% p.a.
1906	5,746	−0.12%
1911	5,745	−0.00%
1921	5,560	−0.33%
1926	5,433	−0.46%
1931	5,426	−0.03%
1936	5,592	+0.60%
1946	5,876	+0.50%
1954	5,788	−0.19%
1962	5,925	+0.29%
1968	7,212	+3.33%
1975	9,150	+3.46%
1982	9,729	+0.88%
1990	9,820	+0.12%
1999	9,371	−0.52%
2007	9,619	+0.33%
2012	9,661	+0.09%
2017	9,571	−0.19%
2023	9,987	+0.71%

Source: EHESS and INSEE (1968-2023)

== Notable people ==
- Éon de l'Étoile
- Pape Sy, basketball player
- Penda Sy, basketball player

== Sport ==
=== Football ===
Loudéac has 2 football teams, FC Saint-Bugan, named after an area in the town, and Loudéac OSC, formed from the amalgamation of Stade Loudéacien (1909) and Avenir Sportif Loudéacien (1966) on 1 June 2001. Loudéac OSC is traditionally a big club on the amateur scene in the region (being one of the larger towns). Recently, the club has restructured with a strong policy on developing youth, which has paid dividends as the club are again rising through the divisions. There is also a female team within the club. There is a handball team in the town, l'Amicale Laîque Loudéac Handball who compete across male and female senior and junior competition. A rugby team based in the town is named the Loup'déaciens (a play on words on the word 'loup' which means 'wolf' in French. There is a strong local pool scene, which has culminated in a youth based in the town becoming a world champion at youth level as part of a French team.

=== Track Cycling ===
Discussions to build a covered Velodrome in Loudeac started in 2013, in 2018 the council held a vote and approved the construction with 62 votes for, 3 against and 3 abstentions. Construction began in January 2022 and was completed in July 2023 costing an estimated 13 million Euros, the velodrome subsequently opened in September 2023. Named 'Vélodrome de Bretagne' it has a 200 metre wooden track and a 1500 person capacity with 500 seats.

== See also ==
- Communes of the Côtes-d'Armor department
