= Penda Ly =

Senegal beauty pageant titleholder

- Born: Penda Ly; 1991 (age 34–35); Dakar, Senegal
- Height: 1.75 m (5 ft 9 in)
- Beauty pageant titleholder
- Title: Miss Senegal 2012
- Hair color: Black
- Major competitions: Miss Senegal 2012 (Winner)

Penda Ly (born in 1991) is Senegal beauty pageant titleholder who was crowned Miss Senegal 2012.

== Miss Senegal ==
Penda Ly, a 21-year-old student of marketing from Dakar, was crowned Miss Senegal 2012 during an event held at the King Pahd Palace.

Awards and achievements
Preceded by Tackto Fatim	Miss Senegal; 2011	Succeeded by Incumbent
