= Hôtel de Ville, Saumur =

Town hall in Saumur, France

Hôtel de Ville
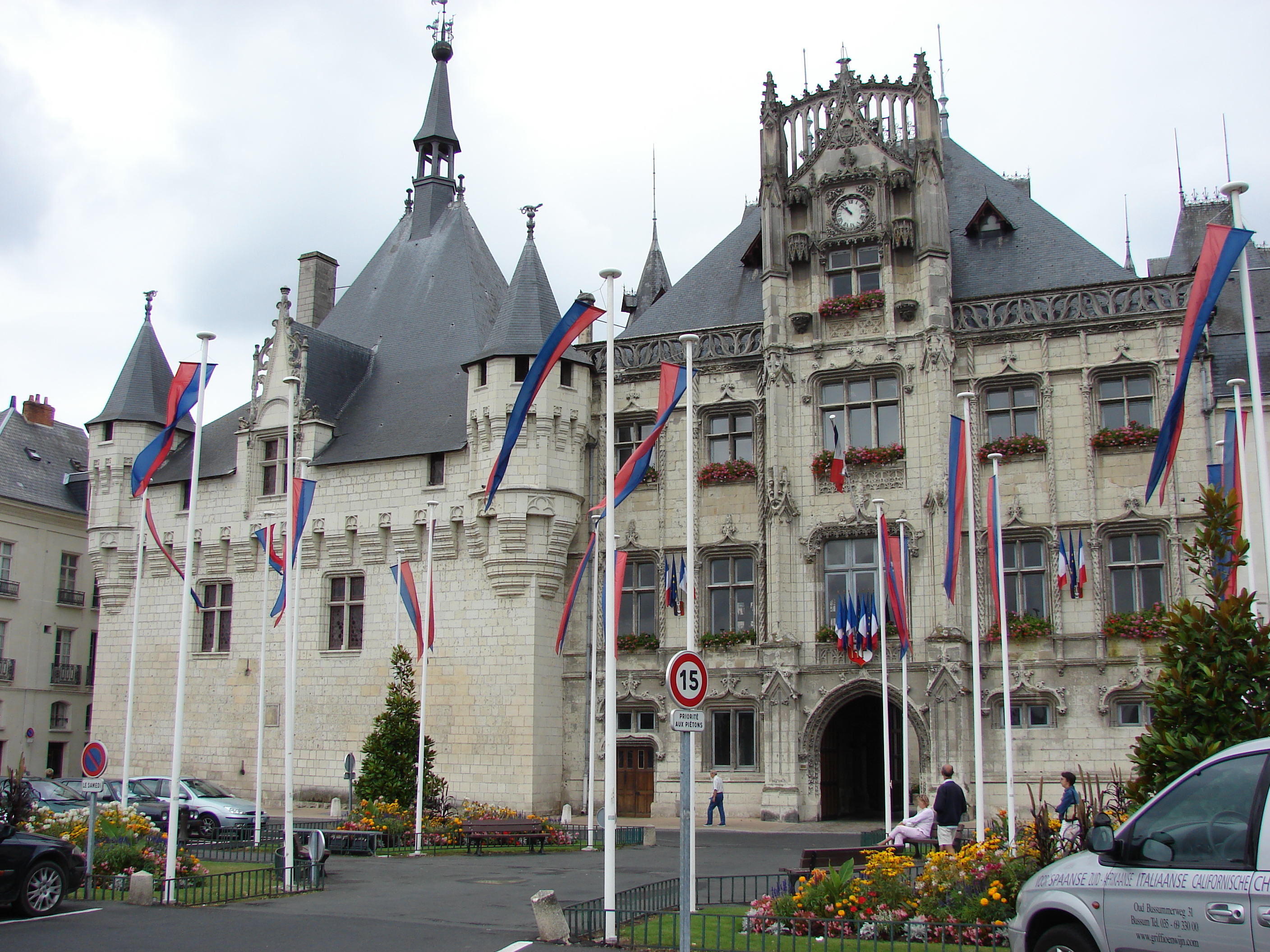
- The main frontage of the Hôtel de Ville in August 2006 (showing the older part on the left and the later part on the right)

General information
- Type: City hall
- Architectural style: Medieval style (early part); Gothic Revival style (later part)
- Location: Saumur, France
- Coordinates: 47.2601°N 0.0755°W
- Completed: 1515

Design and construction
- Architect: Charles Joly-Leterme (later part)

Monument historique
- Official name: Hôtel de ville
- Type: Inscrit
- Designated: 1903
- Reference no.: PA00109329

The Hôtel de Ville (French pronunciation: [otɛl də vil], City Hall) is a municipal building in Saumur, Maine-et-Loire, in western France, standing on Rue Molière. It was designated a monument historique by the French government in 1903.

== History ==
The building was commissioned by Guillaume Bourneau, who was Segnieur of Montaglan and the lieutenant general in Saumur, on behalf of Brandelis de Champagne, who was Seneschal of Anjou, in around 1502. The site he selected was probably occupied by a pre-existing structure which formed part of the town walls. It was designed in the medieval style, built in ashlar stone and was completed in around 1515.

The original design involved a symmetrical main frontage facing north towards the River Loire. It was sparsely fenestrated with just two cross-windows at first floor level and a single gabled cross-window at attic level. It also featured extensive defensive measures, such as crenellations, machicolations and bartizans, to protect it from attack from the river. Internally, the principal room in the original section of the complex was the Salle du Conseil (council chamber), which was decorated with fine wood panelling, a coffered ceiling and a monumental chandelier.

In the mid-19th century, the town council led by the mayor, Charles Louvet, decided to expand the complex to enhance the prestige of the town. It was extended to the west by five extra bays in the Gothic Revival style to a design by Charles Joly-Leterme. The extension was completed in 1862.

The central bay featured a four-stage tower: there was an arched opening with an archivolt in the first stage, tri-partite mullioned and transomed windows with hood moulds in the second and third stages, and a bi-partite mullioned and transomed window with a hood mould in the fourth stage. The tower was surmounted by a finely-carved gable containing a clock and flanked by pilasters supporting pinnacles. The outer bays were mostly fenestrated by cross-windows with hood moulds. At roof level, there was a frieze, which was decorated with carvings depicting vines, a cornice and an intricately carved parapet. Internally, the principal rooms created in the extension included the bureau du maire (mayor's parlour) on the ground floor, and the Salle des Mariages (wedding hall) and the Salle de Réception (reception room) on the first floor.

The municipal museum of Saumur was accommodated within the town hall from 1829 until it relocated to the Château de Saumur in 1912. An extensive programme of restoration works, involving repairs to the external façade, was undertaken between 2018 and 2019.
