= Dolmen de Bagneux =

Dolmen in Saumur, France

Coordinates: 47.24308°N 00.094642°W

- Great Covered Stone
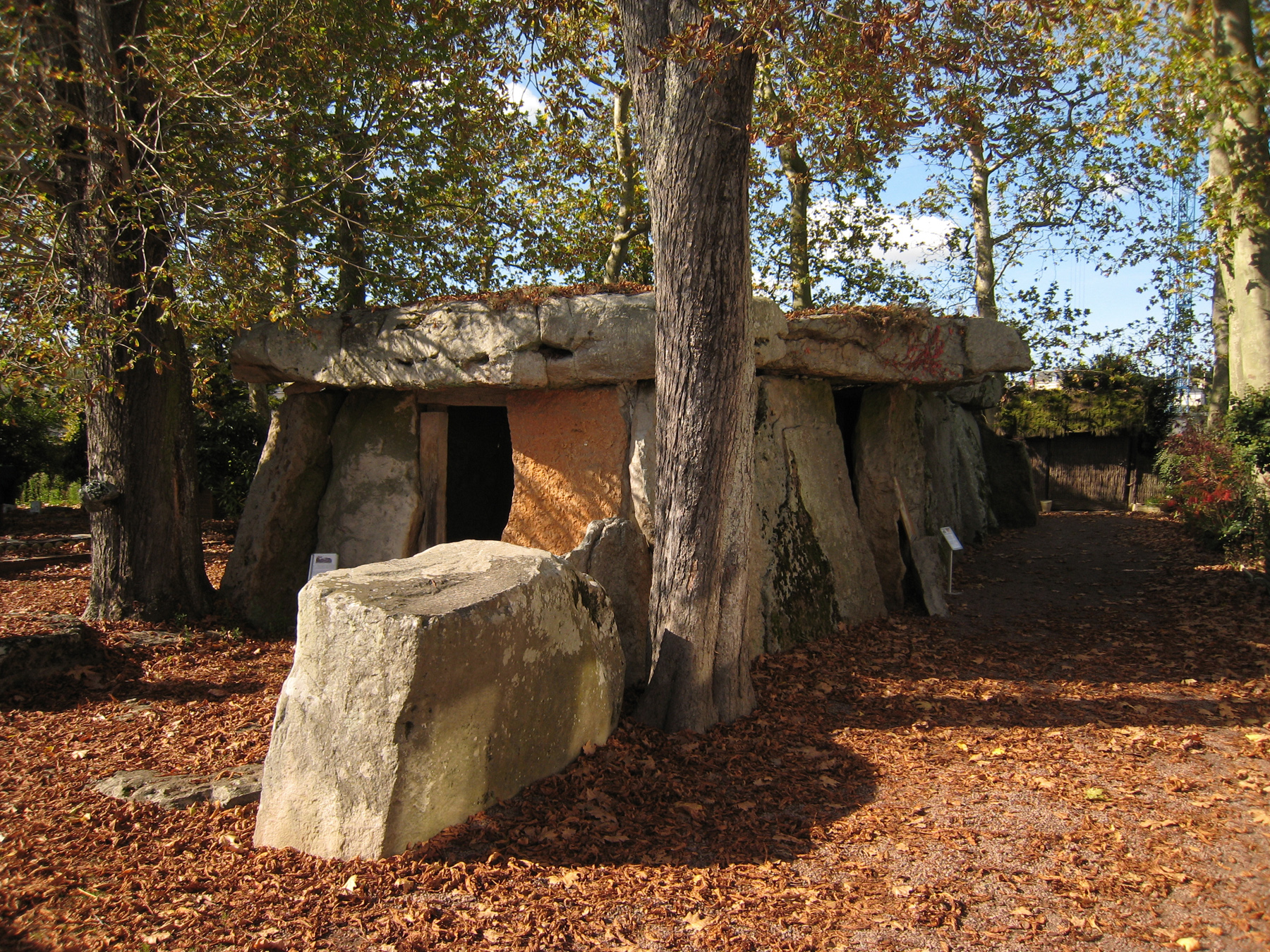
- The dolmen in 2007
- Interactive map of Dolmen de Bagneux
- Type: Dolmen
- Periods: Neolithic
- Location: Saumur, Pays de la Loire, France

History
- Built: c. 3000 BC

Site notes
- Material: Sandstone
- Height: 18 m (59 ft)
- Length: c. 17.3 m (57 ft)
- Width: 5.4 m (18 ft)
- Owner: private
- Public access: Yes

The Dolmen de Bagneux is a megalith located in Saumur, France. It is the largest dolmen in France, and one of the largest in Europe.

== Introduction ==
The dolmen in Bagneux is the largest of the 4,500 dolmens scattered within 60 French departments. Although some portal dolmens in Gironde and in Brittany are longer, such as the Flat Stones in Lockmariaker, which is 23 metres (75 ft) long, and La Roche-aux-Fées of similar in size, none are as high or as voluminous as the dolmen de Bagneaux. In Europe only the Spanish dolmen in Antequera, near Málaga, is larger.

== Description ==
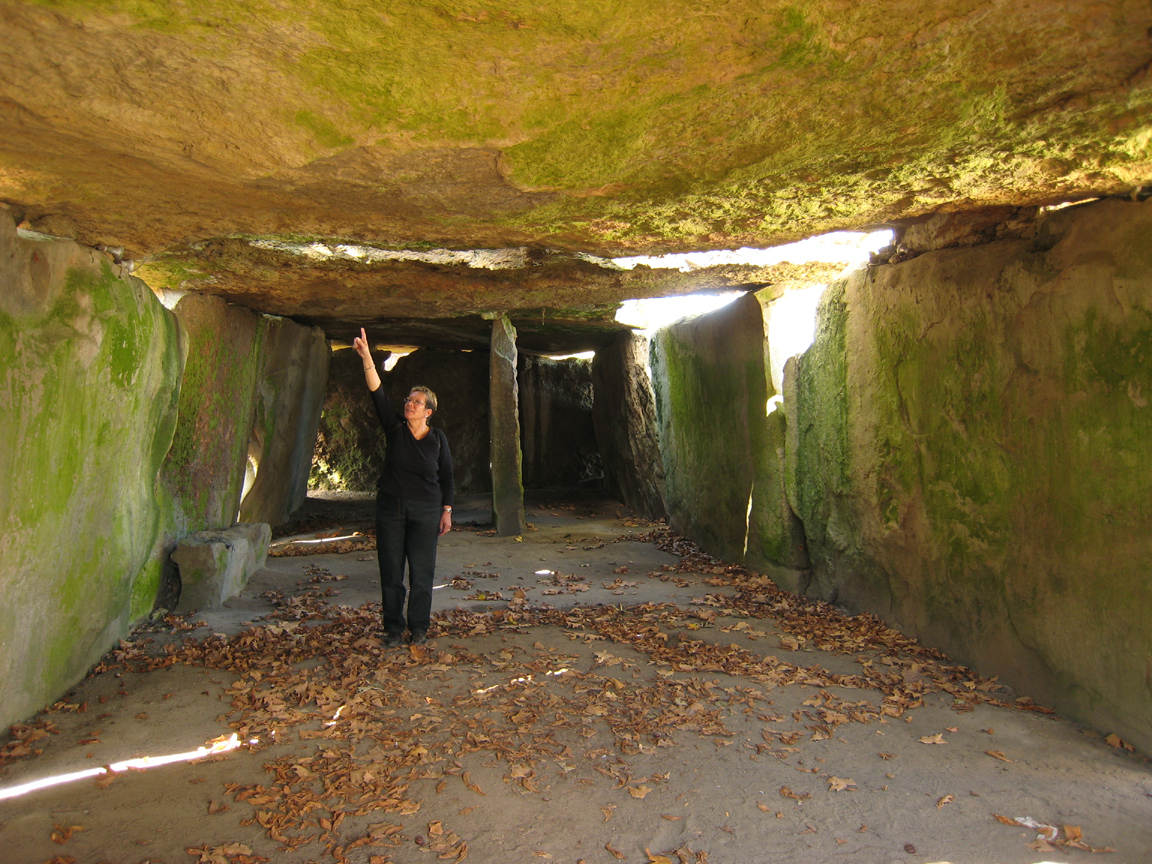
Dolmen interior

=== Size and temporal background ===
The dolmen measures 4.25 metres wide at the entrance and widens to 5.4 metres at the end of the chamber, which stretches 17.3 metres in length. Like all dolmens, this one is likely to date to the Neolithic, c. 3000 BC, and would have received a large number of burials.

=== Materials ===
The flagstones of tertiary sandstone which make up the monument come from nearby. A layer of these sandstones, more or less dislocated, exist on the nearby heights of Bournand and Terrefort. The flagstones of the dolmen were probably scattered on the slopes of the hill from where they were pushed down, being transported about 200 to 400 metres. The dolmen is oriented SE as are nearly all dolmens in Anjou.

=== Description ===
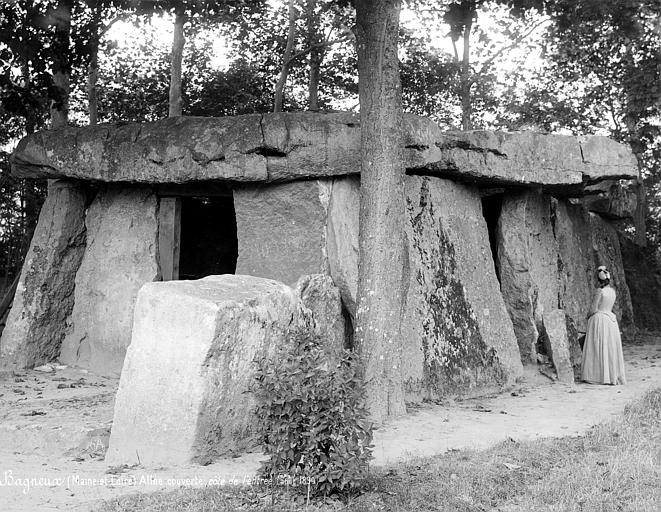
Dolmen exterior

The dolmen is composed of an intact chamber and a damaged porch. The chamber is almost rectangular, only a little narrower on the entrance side. It is made of a single bottom flagstone, 4 supports on the northern side, 4 on the southern side, 4 covering stones and 2 flagstones framing the door. The stone on the right and side, when you look at the monument, is very thin and not very old. It is used to hide a recent wall. The support, in the middle of the chamber does not support anything and is possibly the remains of a dividing wall. Such walls are common among the dolmens of Anjou. The chamber is thus made of 15 flagstones and two wedging stones. Additional wedging stones are possibly still buried.

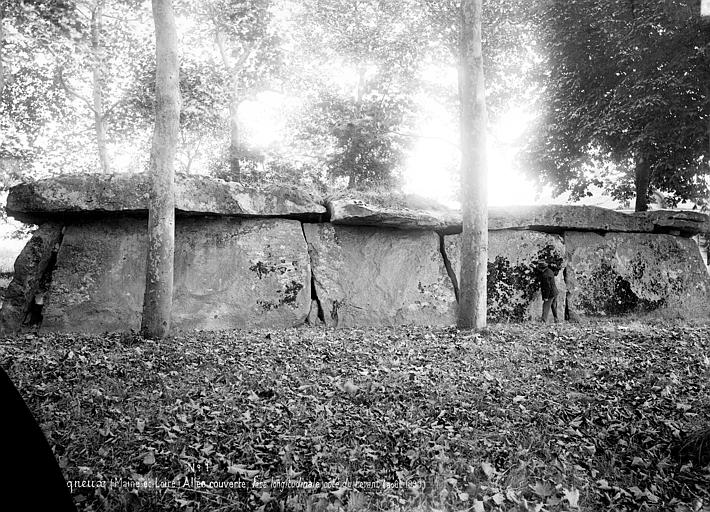
Dolmen exterior

== Legal status ==
The Dolmen de Bagneux is located on private property. Its commercial exploitation is ruled by the protection and the conservation of the monuments classés of Monuments historiques (France).

== See also ==
- Prehistory of France
- Sites mégalithiques en Maine-et-Loire
- La Roche-aux-Fées
- Gavrinis
