= Henri Pierre =

French journalist (1918–1994)

Henri Pierre (20 May 1918 – 17 February 1994) was a French journalist, who co-founded newspaper Le Monde in 1944. He continued as a reporter for the paper until his retirement in 1982.

== Biography ==
=== Personal life ===
Henri Pierre was born on 20 May 1918 in Lyon. He studied at the Saumur Cavalry School, before starting his career as a journalist.

He was married to Brigitte, who died in 1991. They had 3 children, Dominique, François and Oliver.

=== Journalistic career ===
During his time as a journalist for Le Monde, Pierre served as the paper's correspondent in Moscow, London and Washington, D.C.

== Works ==
- La vie quotidienne à la Maison-Blanche au temps de Reagan et de Bush. Hachette, Paris 1990. ISBN 978-2-010-15528-4.

== Bibliography ==
- "Obituary: Henri Pierre, Journalist, 75", New York Times (14-02-94)
