= Haras Nationaux =

French organisation regulating horse breeding

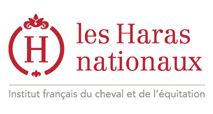
- Type: public administrative organisation
- Purpose: administration of breeding of horses and donkeys
- Region served: France
- Official language: French
- Parent organization: Institut français du cheval et de l'équitation
- Affiliations: École nationale d'équitation; Cadre noir de Saumur
- Website: www.ifce.fr/haras-nationaux/

The Haras Nationaux in France (English literal translation national stud farms) was the French national public administrative body responsible for the regulation and administration of breeding of horses and donkeys in France. It administered twenty-two regional studs, or horse-breeding centres.

== History ==
From 1870 until 1999, Haras Nationaux was a branch of the French ministry of agriculture, then it became an independent governmental department managing the twenty two national stud farms.

In 2010, along with the École nationale d'equitation (ENE, National Equestrian School), it became part of the newly created Institut français du cheval et de l'équitation (IFCE, French Institute of Horse and Riding).

In 2013 the twenty-two national stud farms were privatized, however IFCE continued to support the studs by paying about 75% of the employee salaries. But in 2019 the IFCE announced it would stop supporting the studs and the salary payments would cease as of 2022.

Many of the historic state studs of Europe formed together as the European State Studs Association (ESSA), formed in 2008 and headquartered at Marbach Stud in Germany. As of 2022, ESSA included 30 national stud farms from 15 European countries, including seven prior Haras Nationaux studs from France, including Le Lion d'Angers, Le Pin, Pau-Gélos, Pompadour, Rosières-aux-S., Saint Lô, and Uzès.

== Regional centres ==
Regional centres across France

The 22 regional studs of the Haras Nationaux were:

- Site d'Amboise et de Blois, Blois, Centre-Val de Loire
- Haras national d'Aurillac, Aurillac, Auvergne
- Haras national de Besançon, Besançon, Franche-Comté
- Haras national des Bréviaires, Les Bréviaires, Île-de-France
- Site de Chazey-sur-Ain, Chazey-sur-Ain, Rhône-Alpes
- Haras national de Cluny, Cluny, Burgundy
- Haras national de Compiègne, Compiègne, Picardy
- Haras National d'Hennebont, Hennebont, Brittany
- Haras national de La Roche, La Roche-sur-Yon, Pays de la Loire
- Haras national de Lamballe, Lamballe, Brittany
- Haras national du Pin, Le Pin-au-Haras, Normandy ‡
- Haras national du Lion, Le Lion-d'Angers, Pays de la Loire ‡
- Haras national de Montier, Montier-en-Der, Champagne-Ardenne
- Haras national de Gelos, Gelos, Nouvelle-Aquitaine ‡
- Haras national de Pompadour, Arnac-Pompadour, Limousin ‡
- Haras national de Rodez, Rodez, Midi-Pyrénées
- Haras national de Rosières, Rosières-aux-Salines, Lorraine ‡
- Haras national de Saint-Lô, Saint-Lô, Basse-Normandie ‡
- Haras national de Saintes, Saintes, Nouvelle-Aquitaine
- Haras national de Tarbes, Tarbes, Midi-Pyrénées
- Haras national d'Uzès, Uzès, Languedoc-Roussillon
- Haras national de Villeneuve, Villeneuve-sur-Lot, Nouvelle-Aquitaine ‡

‡ Members of ESSA
