= Essé =

Essé Eczaé (Gallo) Ezieg (Breton)
- Commune
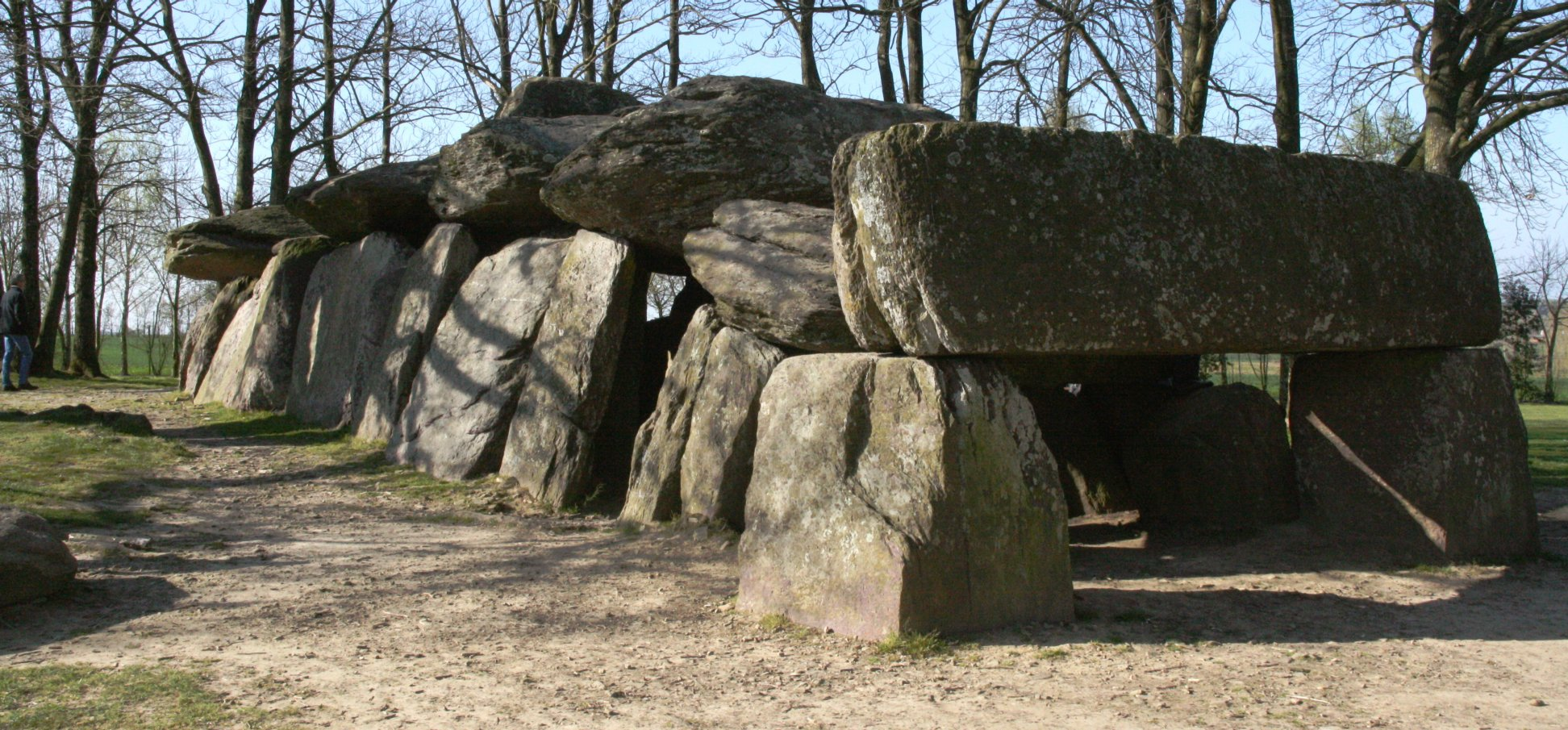
- La Roche-aux-Fées, a dolmen
- Location of Essé
- Location within France Location within Brittany
- Coordinates: 47°57′30″N 1°25′24″W
- Country: France
- Region: Brittany
- Department: Ille-et-Vilaine
- Arrondissement: Fougères-Vitré
- Canton: La Guerche-de-Bretagne
- Intercommunality: Roche-aux-Fées

Government
  - Mayor (2024–2026): Joseph Geslin
- Area^{1}: 23.19 km^{2} (8.95 sq mi)
- Highest elevation: 92 m (302 ft)
- Lowest elevation: 32 m (105 ft)
- Population (2023): 1,028
  - Density: 44.33/km^{2} (114.8/sq mi)
- Time zone: UTC+01:00 (CET)
  - Summer (DST): UTC+02:00 (CEST)
- INSEE/Postal code: 35108 /35150
- ^{1} French Land Register data, which excludes lakes, ponds, glaciers > 1 km^{2} (0.386 sq mi or 247 acres) and river estuaries.

Essé (French pronunciation: [ese]; Gallo: Eczaé, Breton: Ezieg) is a commune in the Ille-et-Vilaine department in Brittany in northwestern France.

== Population ==
Inhabitants of Essé are called Esséens (m pl; Esséennes f pl) in French.

Historical population
Year	Pop.	±% p.a.
1968	831	—
1975	729	−1.85%
1982	747	+0.35%
1990	816	+1.11%
1999	848	+0.43%
2007	1,032	+2.49%
2012	1,131	+1.85%
2017	1,093	−0.68%
2023	1,028	−1.02%
Source: INSEE

== See also ==
- Communes of the Ille-et-Vilaine department
