= Armoured Cavalry Arm =

Armored warfare arm of the French Army

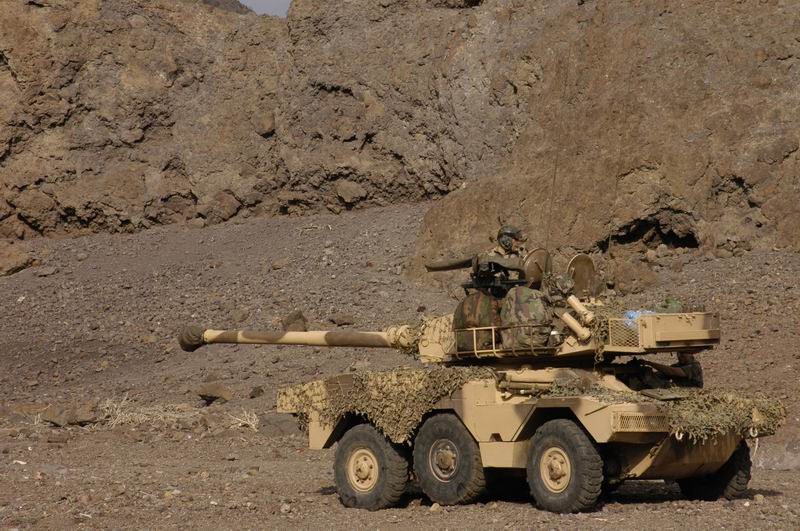
ERC 90 Sagaie of the reconnaissance squadron of the 13e DBLE near Djibouti in 2005.

The Armoured Cavalry Arm (French: Arme blindée et cavalerie, ABC) (French pronunciation: [aʁm blɛ̃de e kavalʁi]) is a component of the French Army. It was formed after World War II by merging the combat tank and cavalry branches. It operates the majority of France's armoured vehicles, though a small minority of France's armour is still operated by infantry regiments. It continues the traditions of the French cavalry and combat tank branches from which it is descended, as well as those of the defunct horse artillery, from which it is not actually descended.

Its training establishment is the Saumur Cavalry School.

== Military doctrine ==
The employment doctrine of the Arme blindée et cavalerie includes the traditional missions of the cavalry adapted to a modern context:

- Rupture of the front, using the charge (jointly with aviation);
- Exploitation of this rupture, thanks to the speed of movement given by motorized and all-terrain vehicles
- Cover of a retreat, a friendly body, a void between two friendly bodies by mask effect
- Reconnaissance (but in an increasingly limited way, aviation, radars and satellites having largely supplanted it in this mission)

Since the end of the USSR, the usefulness of the armoured troops has sometimes been questioned, however it has participated in all major external operations in Bosnia, Lebanon, Africa and Afghanistan. For the latter country, it is clear that the terrain lends itself poorly to the use of armored vehicles: a strong relief making maneuvers complicated, the French armored cavalry deployed has less than 120 men, or less than 3% of the workforce.

Finally, the regiments saw their number of squadrons reduced but 20% of them are also permanently projected.

== List of regiments ==
In 2020, the Armoured Cavalry Branch of the French Army consisted of:

4 Tank regiments, which field 60x Leclerc main battle tanks each:

- 1er Régiment de Chasseurs (1er RCh) in Verdun
- 5e Régiment de Dragons (5e RD) in Mailly-le-Camp
- 501e Régiment de Chars de Combat (501e RCC) in Mourmelon-le-Grand
- 12e Régiment de Cuirassiers (12e RC) in Olivet

5 Cavalry regiments, which field a mix of AMX 10 RC and ERC 90 wheeled tanks:

- 1er Régiment Étranger de Cavalerie (1er REC) in Marseille
- 1er Régiment de Spahis (1er RS) in Valence
- 1er Régiment de Hussards Parachutistes (1er RHP) in Tarbes
- 3e Régiment de Hussards (3e RH) in Metz
- 4e Régiment de Chasseurs (4e RCh) in Gap

4 combat support regiments:

- 1er Régiment de Chasseurs d'Afrique (1er RCA) training regiment in Canjuers
- 2e Régiment de Dragons (2 RD) NBC-defense regiment in Fontevraud-l'Abbaye
- 2e Régiment de Hussards (2e RH) reconnaissance regiment in Haguenau
- 13e Régiment de Dragons Parachutistes (13e RDP) long range reconnaissance regiment in Martignas-sur-Jalle

2 Troops Initial Formation Centres:

- Centre de Formation Initiale des Militaires du rang 7e Brigade Blindée / 3e Régiment de Chasseurs d'Afrique (CFIM 7e BB - 3e RCA), in Valdahon
- Centre de Formation Initiale des Militaires du rang de la 2e Brigade Blindée / 12e Régiment de Chasseurs d'Afrique (CFIM 2e BB - 12e RCA), in Bitche

1 overseas regiment:

- 5e Régiment de Cuirassiers (5e RC) in Abu Dhabi (United Arab Emirates)

== Training ==
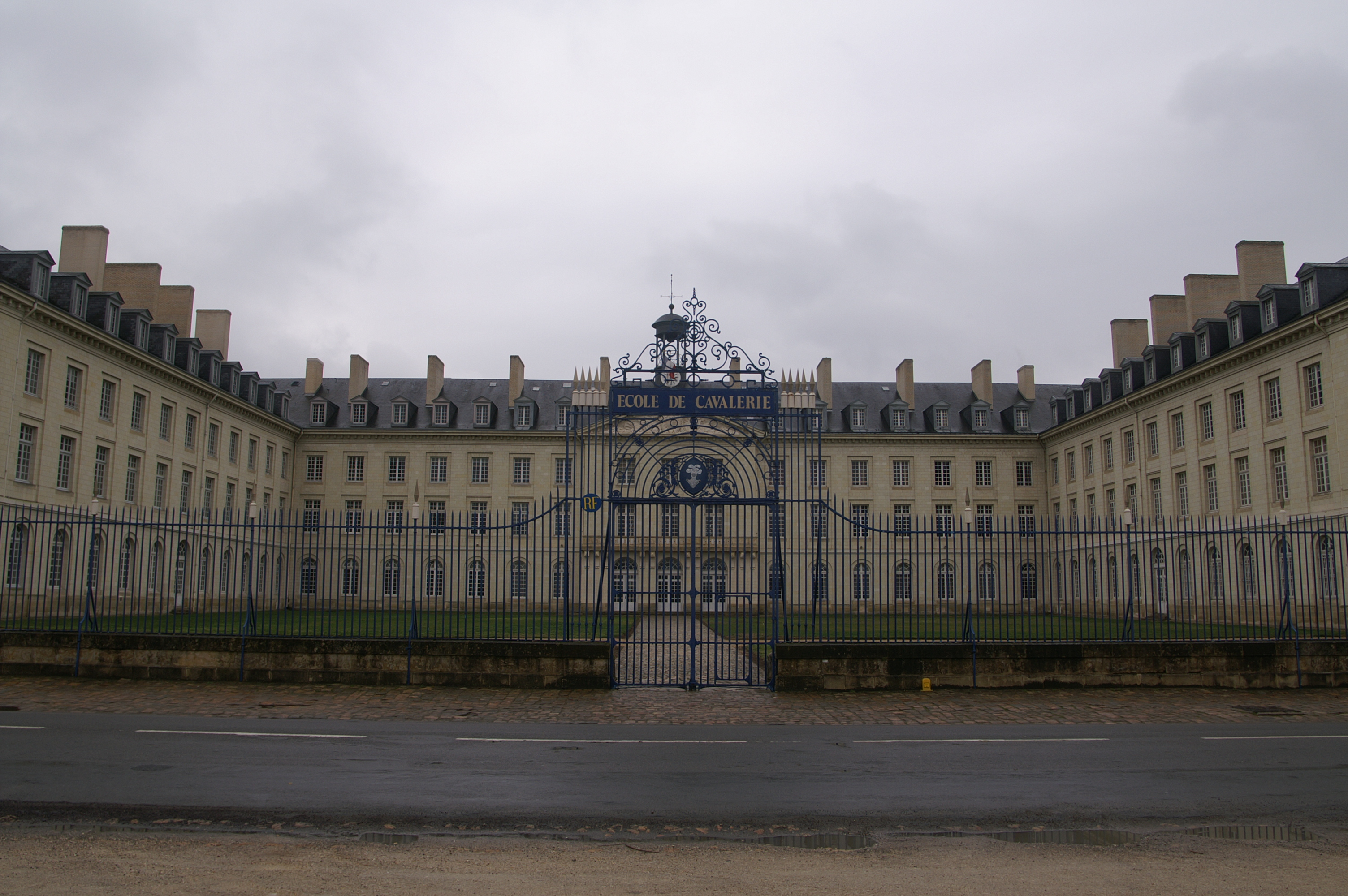
The main building of the École de Cavalerie

=== Cavalry School ===
At the end of the Second World War, the cavalry (mainly in charge of reconnaissance) and the battle tanks merged becoming a singular branch - the Armored Cavalry (ABC). The Saumur Cavalry Application School then became the Armor and Cavalry Application School (EAABC). The Saumur Armored Museum, originally called the “Armored Equipment Documentation Center” (CEDB), was founded in 1965 to help train EAABC students.

=== CSEM ===
The Military Equestrian Sports Center (CSEM), located in Fontainebleau (Seine-et-Marne) trains soldiers and French army horses in equestrian sports with the aim of participating in national and international competitions. Since 1977, the CSEM has guarded the standard of the 8th Dragoon Regiment.
