= Gabriel Dugrès =

French Huguenot grammarian (1643–??)

Gabriel Dugrès (fl. 1643) was a French Huguenot grammarian.

== Life ==
He was born at Saumur, and alludes obscurely to his origin in his Life of Richelieu, where, after stating that he came of a good family of Angiers, he says that his paternal uncle lived at the French court together with other relations, the MM. les Botrus, who were greatly favoured by the queen during Richelieu's ascendency over Louis XIII.

Obliged to quit France on account of his religion in 1631, he came to Cambridge, where he gave lessons in French, and by the liberality of his pupils was enabled to publish his Breve et Accuratum Grammaticæ Gallicæ Compendium, in quo superflua rescinduntur & necessaria non omittuntur, octavo, Cambridge, 1636.

Three years later he was teaching at Oxford, as appears from his Dialogi Gallico-Anglico-Latini, octavo, Oxford, 1639. Some of these dialogues are very amusing as giving a picture of the mode of living and manners of our forefathers. A second edition, enlarged, with Regulæ Pronunciandi, ut et Verborum Gallicorum Paradigmata, appeared octavo, Oxford, 1652; a third, without the additions, was issued duodecimo, Oxford, 1660. Dugrès was also author of Jean Arman Du Plessis, Duke of Richelieu and Peere of France; his Life, &c., octavo, London, 1643, which, although written, as he says, with "a ruffe pen", is an interesting tract. It was followed by a translation "out of the French copie" of The Will and Legacies of Cardinal Richelieu … together with certain instructions which he left the French King. Also some remarkable passages that hath happened in France since the death of the said Cardinal, quarto, London, 1643.
