= Saumur =

- Subprefecture and commune
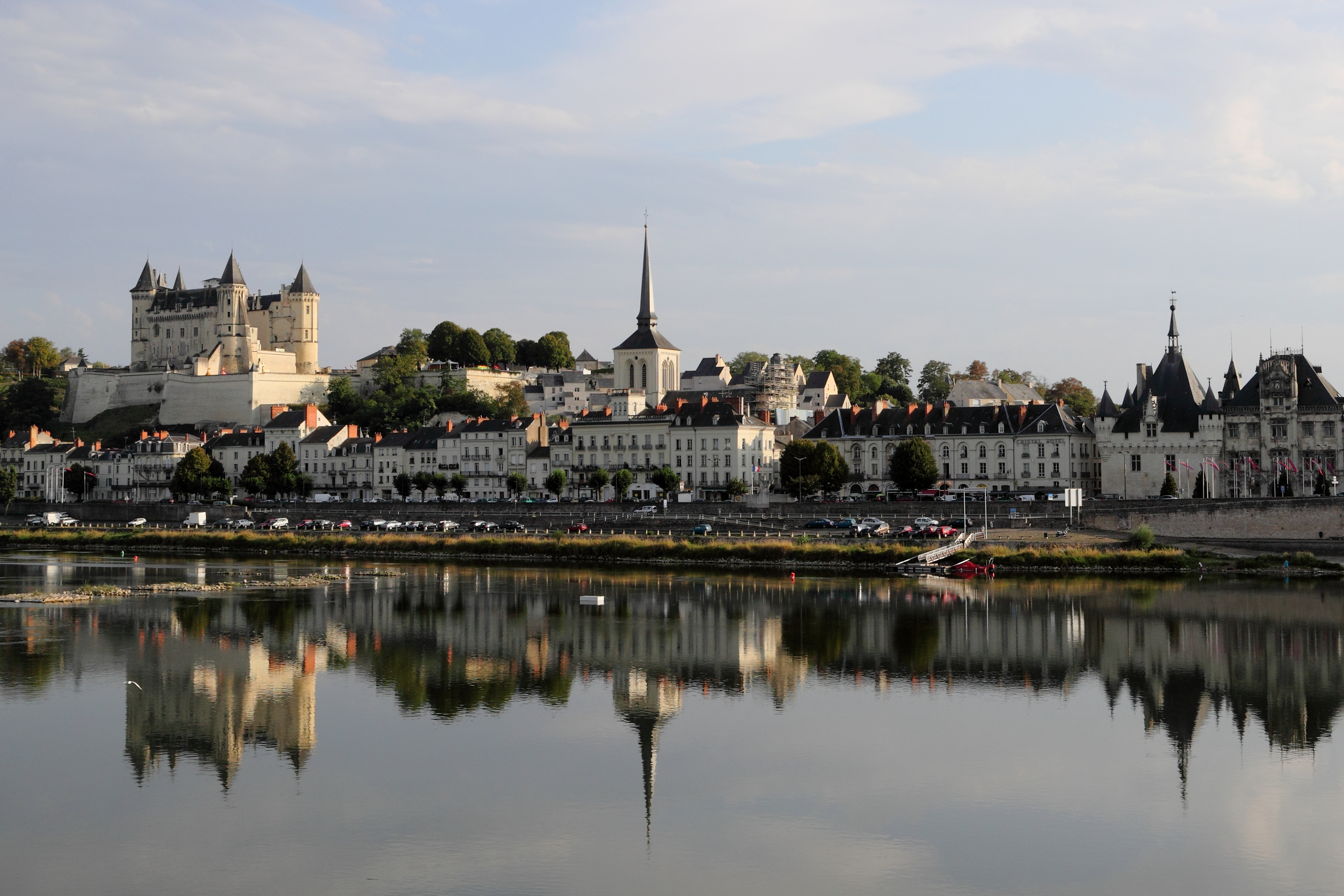
- The chateau, the church of Saint-Pierre-du-Marais and the town hall, seen from across the Loire

- Coat of arms
- Motto(s): Mœnia fallunt hostem dextra domat tormentum "(our) walls defy the enemy, (our) arms vanquish the assault"
- Location of Saumur
- Location within France Location within Pays de la Loire
- Coordinates: 47°15′36″N 0°04′37″W
- Country: France
- Region: Pays de la Loire
- Department: Maine-et-Loire
- Arrondissement: Saumur
- Canton: Saumur
- Intercommunality: CA Saumur Val de Loire

Government
  - Mayor (2020–2026): Jackie Goulet (DVG)
- Area^{1}: 66.25 km^{2} (25.58 sq mi)
- Elevation: 30 m (98 ft)
- Highest elevation: 95 m (312 ft)
- Lowest elevation: 20 m (66 ft)
- Population (2023): 26,241
  - Density: 396.1/km^{2} (1,026/sq mi)
- Demonym: Saumurois
- Time zone: UTC+01:00 (CET)
  - Summer (DST): UTC+02:00 (CEST)
- INSEE/Postal code: 49328 /49400
- Website: www.ville-saumur.fr
- ^{1} French Land Register data, which excludes lakes, ponds, glaciers > 1 km^{2} (0.386 sq mi or 247 acres) and river estuaries.

City coat of arms from 1699 to 1985

City coat of arms since 1986

Saumur (French: [somyʁ]) is a commune in and subprefecture of the Maine-et-Loire department in western France.

The town is located between the Loire and Thouet rivers, and is surrounded by the vineyards of Saumur itself, Chinon, Bourgueil, Coteaux du Layon, etc. Saumur station has rail connections to Tours, Angers, La Roche-sur-Yon and Nantes.

== Toponymy ==
First attested in the Medieval Latin form of Salmuri in 968 AD, the origin of the name is obscure. Albert Dauzat hypothesized a pre-Celtic unattested element *sala 'marshy ground' (cf. Celtic salm 'which jumps and flows'), followed by another unattested element meaning "wall". Many places in Europe seem to contain *Sal(m)- elements, which may share Old European roots.

== History ==
The Dolmen de Bagneux on the south of the town, is 23 meters long and is built from 15 large slabs of the local stone, weighing over 500 tons. It is the largest in France.

The Château de Saumur was constructed in the 10th century to protect the Loire River crossing from Norman attacks after the settlement of Saumur was sacked in 845. The castle, destroyed in 1067 and inherited by the House of Plantagenet, was rebuilt by Henry II of England in the later 12th century. It changed hands several times between Anjou and France until 1589.

Houses in Saumur are constructed almost exclusively of Tuffeau stone. The caves dug to excavate the stone are now often used as commercial wine cellars. The Hôtel de Ville was completed in around 1515.

Amyraldism, or the School of Saumur, is a distinctive form of Reformed theology taught by Moses Amyraut at the Academy of Saumur in the 17th century. Saumur is also the scene for Balzac's novel Eugénie Grandet, written in 1833.

Prior to the French Revolution, Saumur was the capital of the Sénéchaussée de Saumur, a bailiwick which existed until 1793. Saumur was the location of the Battle of Saumur during the Revolt in the Vendée. It hosted a state prison under Napoleon. The town was an equestrian centre with both the military cavalry school from 1783 and later the Cadre Noir equestrian team.

=== World War II ===
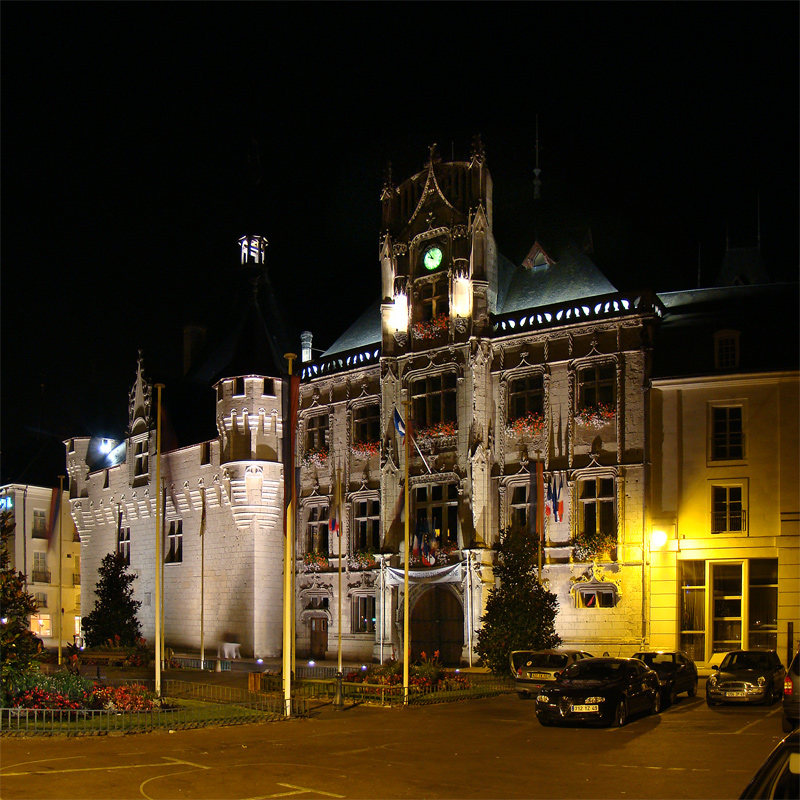
The Hôtel de Ville

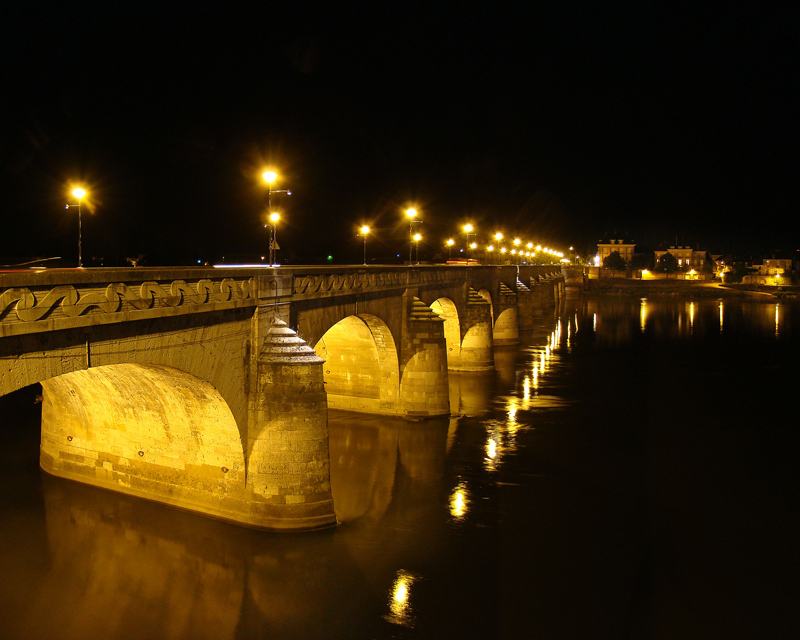
The Cessart Bridge

During the Battle of France in World War II, Saumur was the site of the Battle of Saumur (1940); the town and south bank of the Loire were defended by the teenage cadets of the cavalry school.

In 1944 it was the target of the first Tallboy and the fourth Azon bombing raids by Allied planes. On 8/9 June 1944, 5,400 kg (12,000 lb) Tallboy "earthquake" bombs were first used, against a railway tunnel near Saumur. The hastily organized night raid was to stop a planned German Panzer Division which was travelling to engage the newly landed allied forces in Normandy. The panzers were expected to use the railway to cross the Loire. No. 83 Squadron RAF illuminated the area with flares from four Avro Lancasters and marked the target at low level by three de Havilland Mosquitos. 25 Lancasters of No. 617 Squadron RAF, the "Dambusters" then dropped their Tallboys from 5,500 m (18,000 ft) with great accuracy. They hit the approaches to the bridge, blocked the railway cutting and one pierced the roof of the tunnel, bringing down a huge quantity of rock and soil which blocked the tunnel, badly delaying the German reinforcements moving towards Normandy, especially 2nd SS Panzer Division Das Reich. The damaged tunnel was quickly dug out to make a deeper cutting, resulting in the need for a second attack.

On 22 June, nine Consolidated B-24 Liberators of the United States Army Air Forces used the new Azon 450 kg (1,000 lb) glide bombs against the Saumur rail bridge; escorted by 43 North American P-51 Mustangs. They failed to destroy the bridge. During the morning of 24 June, 38 American Boeing B-17 Flying Fortresses with conventional bombs attacked the bridge; escort was provided by 121 of 135 P-51s. The bridge was damaged.

The town of Saumur was awarded the Croix de Guerre with palm for its resistance and display of French patriotism during the war.

== Main attractions ==
Saumur is home to the Cadre Noir, the École Nationale d'Équitation (National Equestrian School), known for its annual horse shows, as well as the Armoured Branch and Cavalry Training School, the officer school for armed forces (tanks).

There is the national tank museum, the Musée des Blindés, with more than 850 armored vehicles, wheeled or tracked. Most of them are from France, though some come from other countries such as Brazil, Germany, and the Soviet Union, as well as axis and allied vehicles of World War Two.

The annual military Carrousel takes place in July each year, as it has done for over 160 years, with displays of horse cavalry skills, historic and modern military vehicles.

Amongst the most important monuments of Saumur are the great Château de Saumur itself which stands high above the town, and the nearby Château de Beaulieu which stands just 200 metres from the south bank of the Loire River and which was designed by the architect Jean Drapeau. A giant sequoia tree (which is protected) stands in the grounds of Château de Beaulieu. The Dolmen de Bagneux is on the old road going south.

The architectural character of the town owes much to the fact that it is constructed almost exclusively of Tuffeau stone.

The wine industry surrounds Saumur, many utilising the tunnels as cellars with the hundreds of domaines producing white, red, rosé and sparkling wines. Visits to producers and the annual Grandes Tablées du Saumur-Champigny is an annual event held in early August with over 1 km of tables set up in Saumur so people can sample the local foods and wine.

Saumur has a weekly market every Saturday morning with hundreds of stalls open for business in the streets and squares of the old town, from before 8am.

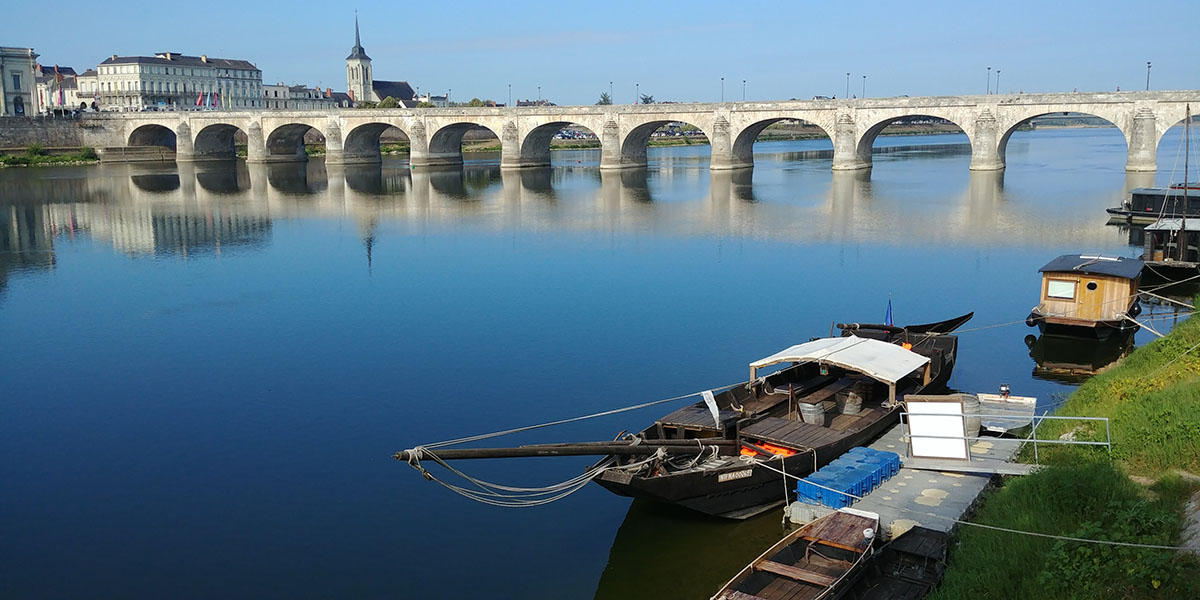
Cessart Bridge over the River Loire in Saumur

== Notable people ==
Saumur was the birthplace of:

- Gabriel Dugrès (fl. 1643), French Huguenot grammarian
- Anne Le Fèvre Dacier (1654–1720), scholar and translator of classics
- Jeanne Delanoue (1666–1736), made a Roman Catholic Saint in 1982
- François Bontemps (1753–1811), General of the French Revolutionary Wars
- Charles Ernest Beulé (1826–1874), archeologist
- Coco Chanel (1883–1971), fashion designer
- Jean de La Brète (pen name of Alice Cherbonnel; 1858–1945), novelist
- Marie Adrien Persac (1823–1873), Franco-American lithographer and photographer
- Yves Robert (1920–2002), actor, composer, director, writer, producer
- Jack le Goff (1931–2009), equestrian
- Fanny Ardant (born 1949), actress
- Dominique Pinon (born 1955), actor
- Youna Dufournet (born 1993), French artistic gymnast

Other:

- The French mathematician Abraham de Moivre initially studied logic at Saumur.
- Marquis de Sade was briefly imprisoned in the Château de Saumur (then a prison) in 1768.
- Jehan Alain (1911–1940), organist and composer, was killed during the Battle of Saumur.

== Twin towns – sister cities ==
Saumur is twinned with:

- Formigine, Italy
- Verden an der Aller, Germany
- Warwick, England, United Kingdom
- (United States) Asheville, North Carolina, US

== Demographics ==
In 1973 Saumur absorbed four neighbouring communes. The population data for 1968 and earlier in the table and graph below refer to the pre-1973 borders.

Historical population of Saumur

Year	Pop.	±%
1793	12,300	—
1800	9,585	−22.1%
1806	9,984	+4.2%
1821	10,454	+4.7%
1831	10,652	+1.9%
1836	12,020	+12.8%
1841	12,258	+2.0%
1846	12,566	+2.5%
1851	14,119	+12.4%
1856	14,505	+2.7%
1861	14,079	−2.9%
1866	13,663	−3.0%
1872	12,552	−8.1%
1876	13,822	+10.1%
1881	14,186	+2.6%
1886	14,187	+0.0%
1891	14,867	+4.8%
1896	16,440	+10.6%
1901	16,233	−1.3%

Year	Pop.	±%
1906	16,392	+1.0%
1911	16,198	−1.2%
1921	15,956	−1.5%
1926	16,210	+1.6%
1931	16,532	+2.0%
1936	17,158	+3.8%
1946	17,635	+2.8%
1954	18,169	+3.0%
1962	20,773	+14.3%
1968	21,551	+3.7%
1975	32,515	+50.9%
1982	32,149	−1.1%
1990	30,131	−6.3%
1999	29,857	−0.9%
2007	28,113	−5.8%
2012	27,523	−2.1%
2017	26,734	−2.9%
2023	26,241	−1.8%

Source: Cassini and INSEE

== Climate ==
Climate data for Saumur (Montreuil-Bellay) (1991–2020 normals, extremes 1986–present)
Month	Jan	Feb	Mar	Apr	May	Jun	Jul	Aug	Sep	Oct	Nov	Dec	Year
Record high °C (°F)	16.5 (61.7)	22.0 (71.6)	25.0 (77.0)	29.0 (84.2)	32.6 (90.7)	43.4 (110.1)	40.9 (105.6)	39.7 (103.5)	36.0 (96.8)	31.4 (88.5)	22.9 (73.2)	19.6 (67.3)	43.4 (110.1)
Mean daily maximum °C (°F)	8.8 (47.8)	10.2 (50.4)	13.8 (56.8)	16.9 (62.4)	20.6 (69.1)	24.3 (75.7)	26.4 (79.5)	26.6 (79.9)	23.0 (73.4)	17.9 (64.2)	12.5 (54.5)	9.3 (48.7)	17.5 (63.5)
Daily mean °C (°F)	5.8 (42.4)	6.4 (43.5)	9.1 (48.4)	11.6 (52.9)	15.2 (59.4)	18.6 (65.5)	20.4 (68.7)	20.4 (68.7)	17.2 (63.0)	13.5 (56.3)	9.0 (48.2)	6.2 (43.2)	12.8 (55.0)
Mean daily minimum °C (°F)	2.9 (37.2)	2.5 (36.5)	4.4 (39.9)	6.2 (43.2)	9.8 (49.6)	12.8 (55.0)	14.4 (57.9)	14.3 (57.7)	11.4 (52.5)	9.0 (48.2)	5.5 (41.9)	3.2 (37.8)	8.0 (46.4)
Record low °C (°F)	−14.1 (6.6)	−12.8 (9.0)	−10.1 (13.8)	−3.3 (26.1)	0.2 (32.4)	4.3 (39.7)	7.2 (45.0)	4.6 (40.3)	2.4 (36.3)	−3.3 (26.1)	−8.6 (16.5)	−9.7 (14.5)	−14.1 (6.6)
Average precipitation mm (inches)	56.1 (2.21)	43.9 (1.73)	44.0 (1.73)	50.9 (2.00)	54.0 (2.13)	42.7 (1.68)	43.6 (1.72)	41.1 (1.62)	47.2 (1.86)	67.5 (2.66)	65.5 (2.58)	59.8 (2.35)	616.3 (24.26)
Average precipitation days (≥ 1.0 mm)	10.7	9.4	9.2	9.1	9.0	7.3	6.5	6.6	7.2	9.8	11.8	11.7	108.4
Source: Meteociel

== See also ==
- Musée des Blindés
- Battle of Saumur (1940)
- National Equestrian School
