= Château de Saumur =

Castle in Saumur, Maine-et-Loire, France

Coordinates: 47°15′22″N 0°04′21″W

- Saumur, France
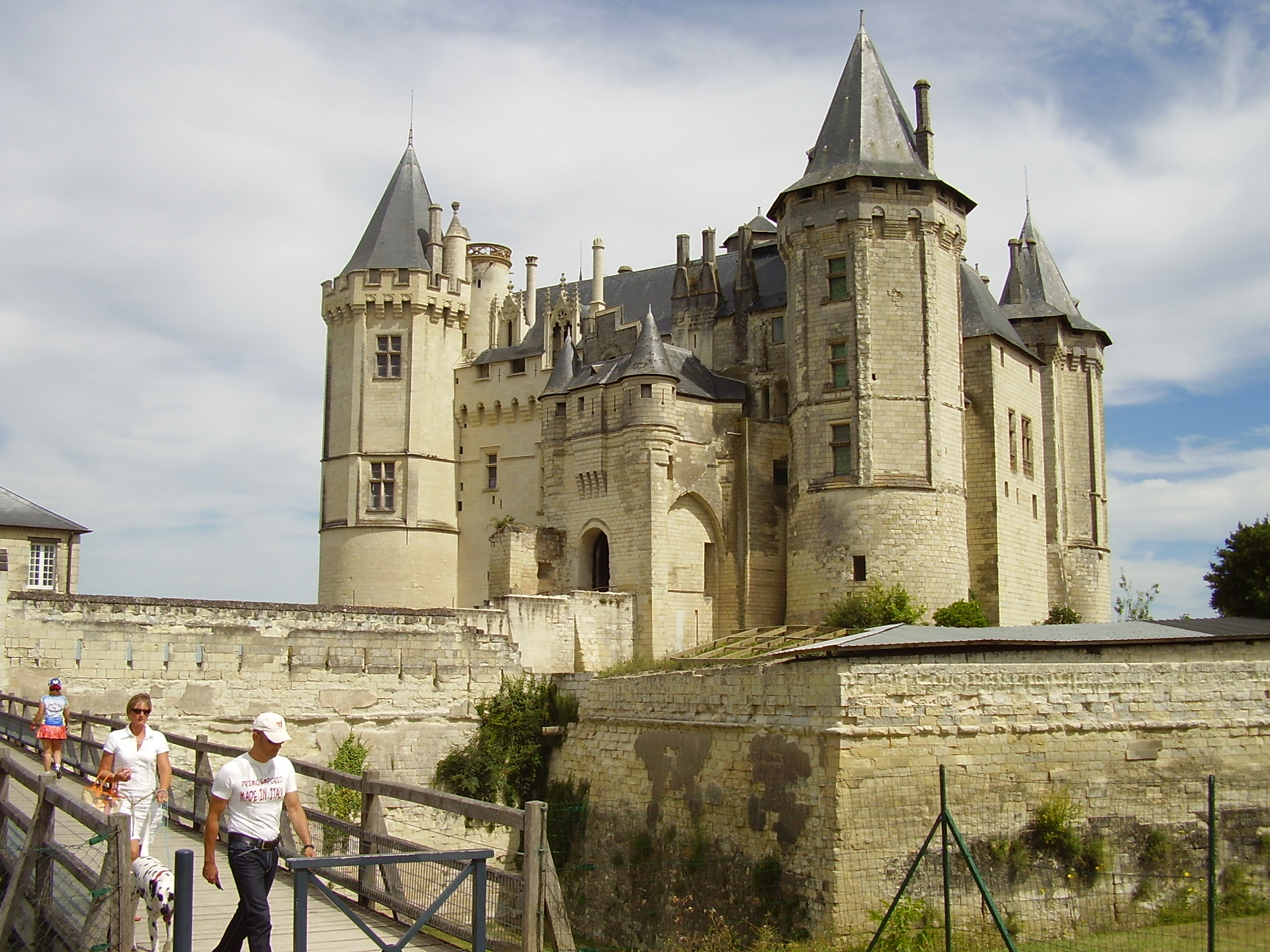

Site information
- Type: Castle

Site history
- Built: 10th century

The Château de Saumur, originally built as a castle and later developed as a château, is located in the French town of Saumur, in the Maine-et-Loire département. It was originally constructed in the 10th century by Theobald I, Count of Blois, as a fortified stronghold against Norman attacks. It overlooks the confluence of the rivers Loire and Thouet. In 1026 it came into the hands of Fulk Nerra, count of Anjou, who bequeathed it to his Plantagenet heirs. Following its destruction in 1067, the castle was rebuilt by Henry II of England in the later 12th century.

== History ==
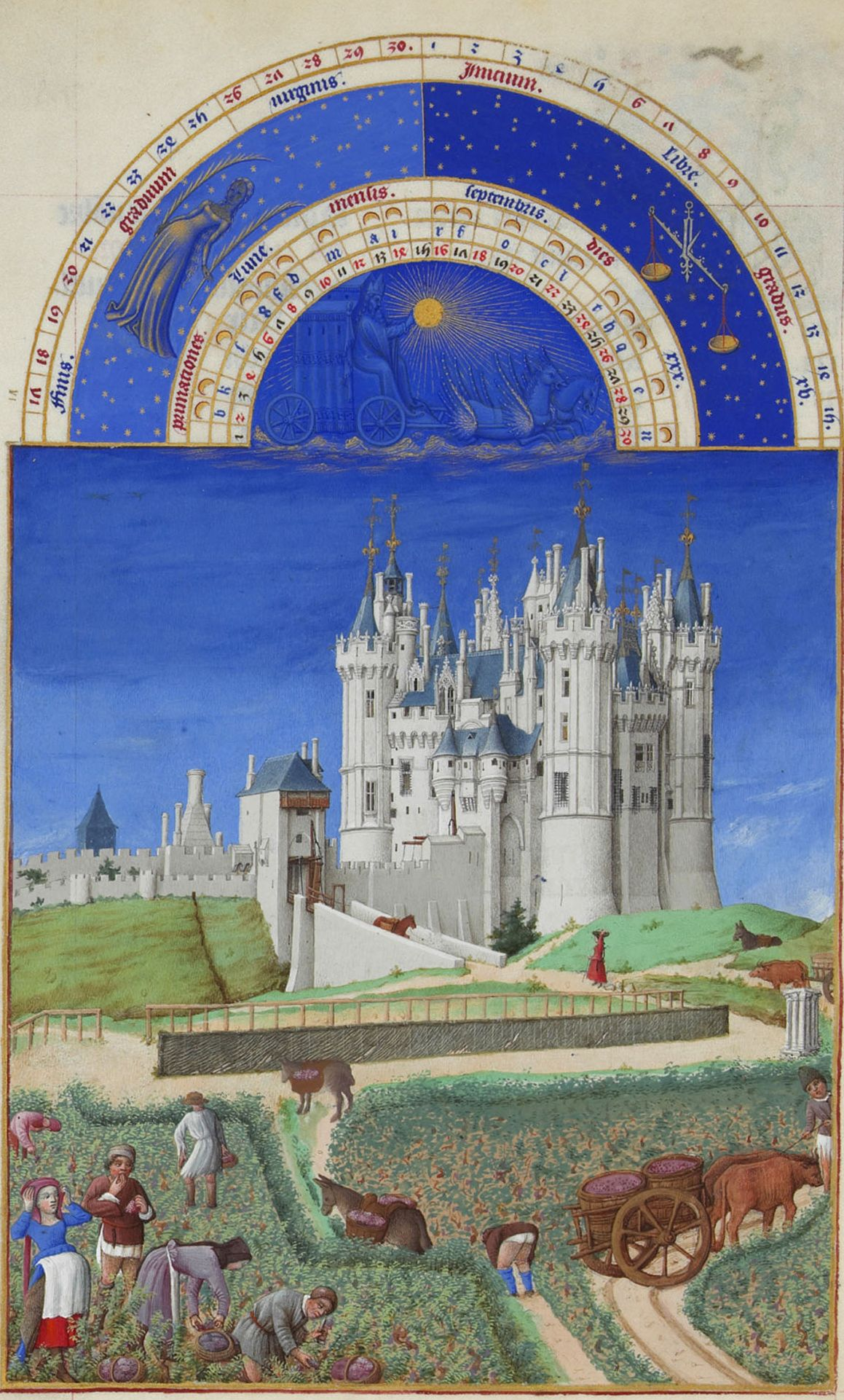
Château de Saumur as pictured in Les Très Riches Heures du duc de Berry

In 1203, Philip II of France made Saumur part of his royal domain, and seized the castle. He buttressed the castle for further security. The castle became an official royal residence shortly thereafter, and Louis IX, the resident in 1227, built upon the fortress. In the 1360s, Louis I of Anjou would later replace the round towers of the castle with octangonal towers, which still exist in the château's current form.

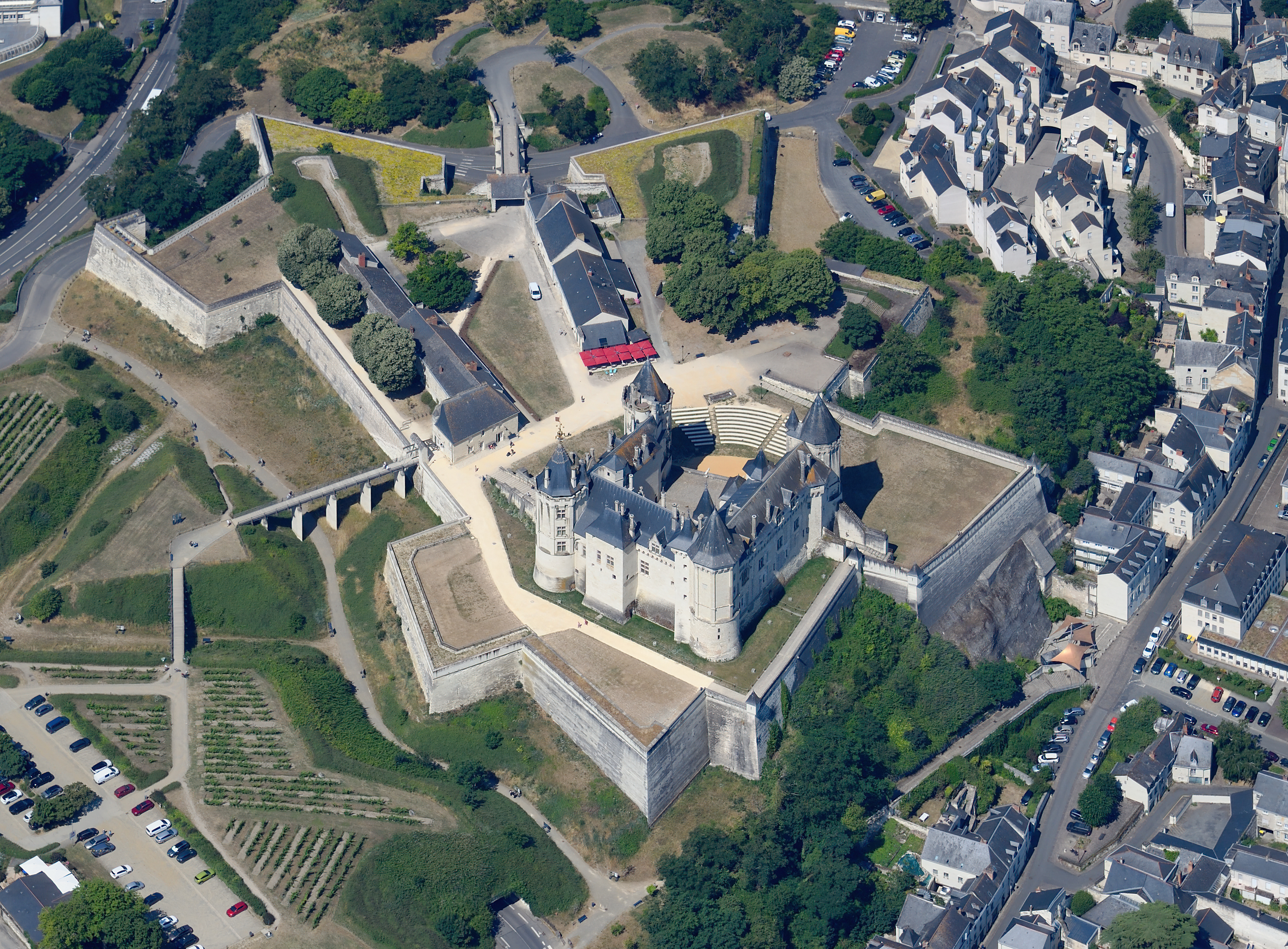
Aerial view

The page for September in the Tres Riches Heures du Duc de Berry depicts the Château as it looked in 1410. It states that René of Anjou lived there until his death in 1480. The castle changed hands several times until 1589 when the Protestant King Henry IV (of France and Navarre) gave the castle to Duplessis-Mornay.

The Chateau originally had 4 wings that enclosed the courtyard; one of the wings fell apart in the 1600s. The courtyard also has a source of groundwater for its inhabitants during the Chateau’s occupancy period.

In 1621 the castle was converted into an army barracks. Nearly two centuries later it was converted into a state prison under Napoleon Bonaparte.

In the first part of the 20th century, the city of Saumur acquired the castle and began a restoration program to house the museum of the decorative arts. In line with the Saumur area's equestrian tradition and its famous "Cadre Noir", the castle also serves as a Museum of the Horse. The castle has a dungeon and watchtower, and houses the Musée de la Figurine-Jouet, a collection of very old toys and figurines of soldiers, kings of France, and clowns.

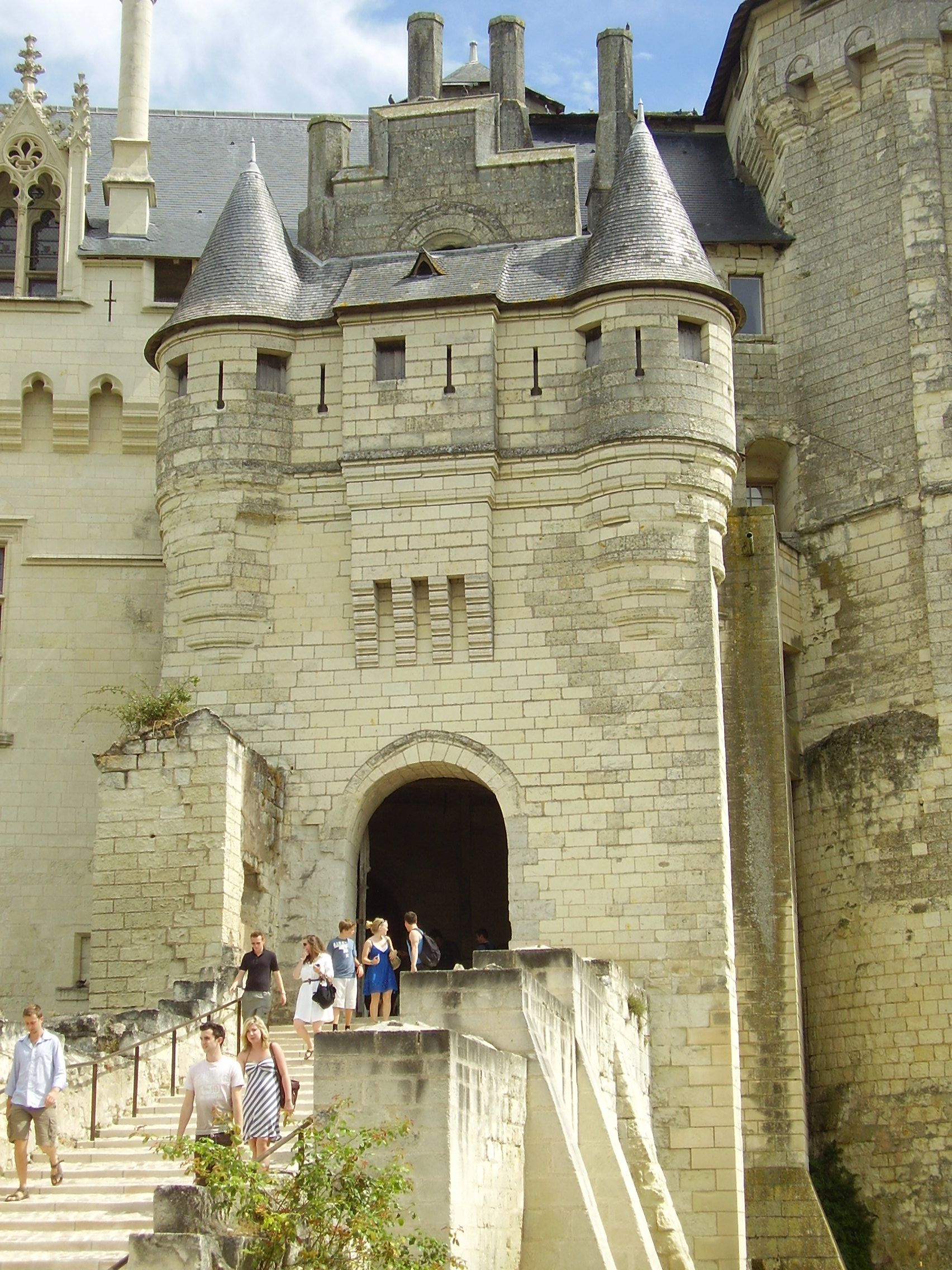

The Château de Saumur has been listed as a monument historique by the French Ministry of Culture since 1862.

In 1906, the town purchased the castle from the state government, and turned it into a museum. The castle suffered damages during WWII shelling, and was restored by 1997.

On 22 April 2001, part of the northern rampart collapsed and damaged the area below. The basement below the castle was stabilized during rebuilding, and the rampart's reconstruction was completed in 2007.

== See also ==
- List of castles in France
