= École de cavalerie, Saumur =

French military training establishment

The École de cavalerie (French pronunciation: [ekɔl də kavalʁi], Cavalry School) is a French military training establishment at Saumur in Western France. Originally set up to train the cavalry of the French Army, it now trains the troops of France's Arme blindée et cavalerie (Armoured Cavalry Arm) in reconnaissance and armoured warfare.

== History ==
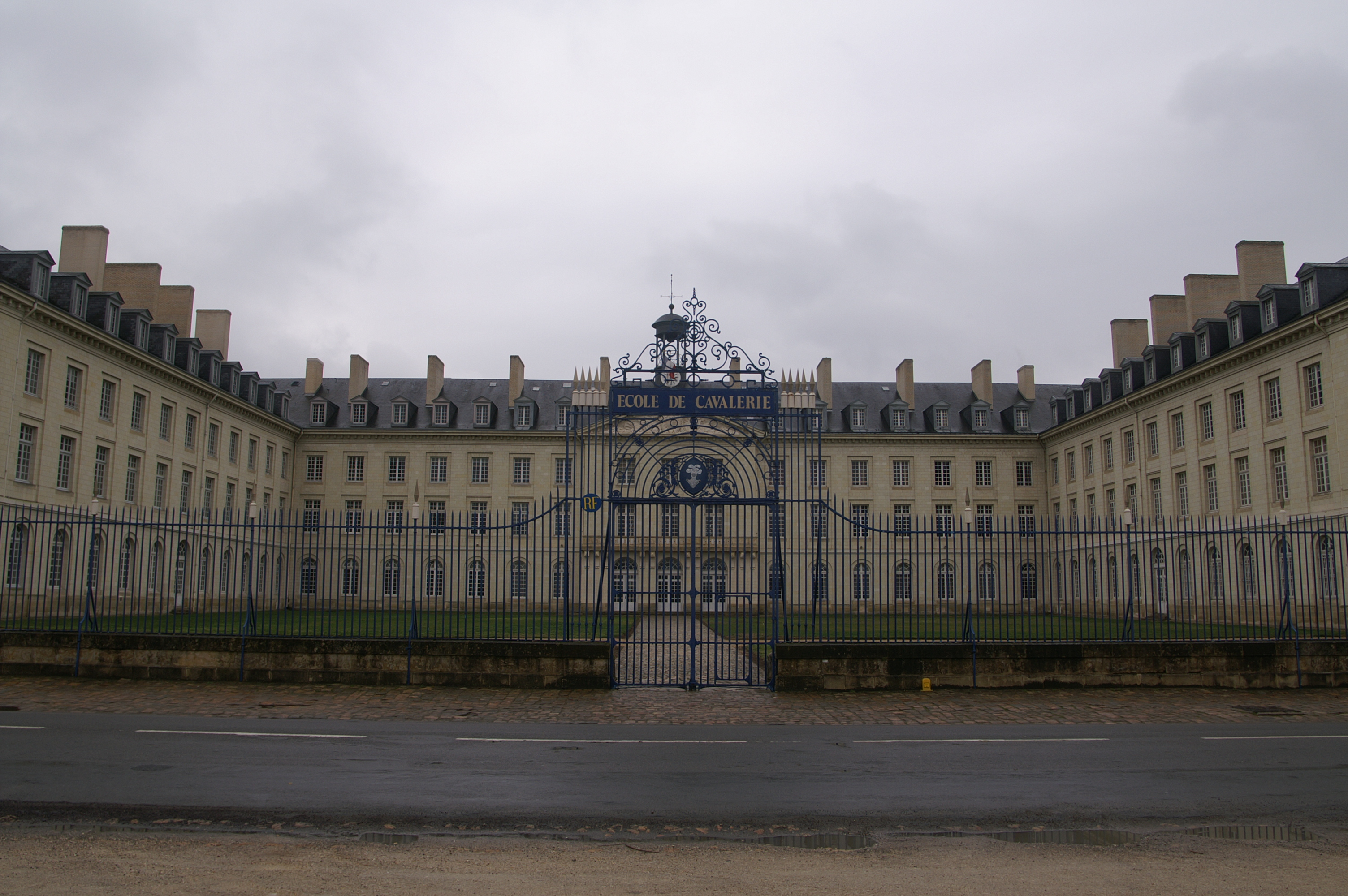
The main building of the École de Cavalerie

In 1763, Louis XV (via the Duc de Choiseul) reorganised the French cavalry. A new school for officers from all the cavalry regiments was set up at Saumur, managed and supervised by the "Corps Royal des Carabiniers" - since its inception the school has been hosted in the carabinier regiment's quarter of the town, latterly in a magnificent 18th-century building. This functioned until 1788.

At the end of 1814, after the First Restoration, Louis XVIII set up the "École d'Instruction des Troupes à cheval" in Saumur. Its activities declined from 1822 onwards so it was regenerated by Charles X under the name of the "École Royale de Cavalerie" (later renamed the École impériale de cavalerie de Saumur). Most of its building complex was taken up with a military riding area and a riding-academy training hall.

From 1830, with the disappearance of the École de Versailles, Saumur became the capital and sole repository of the French equestrian tradition, and its knowledge (such as in the Cadre Noir and its training regime in dressage) is still recognised throughout the world. At the end of the Second World War the French mounted cavalry (reduced to several squadrons of North African spahis retained for patrol work and ceremonial duties by this date) and armoured troops merged to form the 'Arme blindée et cavalerie' (ABC), with the École de Saumur becoming the new branch's training centre.

After a 1985 reorganisation, the 12th Light Armoured Division (12 DLB) was planned as a mobilisation division of the French Army, with its headquarters to be formed on the basis of the staff of the École d'application de l'Arme blindée et de la cavalerie (EAABC) at Saumur. The division comprised the 507 RCC at Saumur (AMX-30s), the 3 RCh(T), also at Saumur and also attached to the EAABC, the Legion's 4th Foreign Regiment at Castelnaudary, and the 33rd Regiment of Artillery (RA), at St Maixent, attached to an NCO school.

== See also ==
=== Related articles ===
- National Equestrian School

=== Bibliography ===
- (in French) Extrait de l’Ordonnance de Cavalerie pour sous-officiers et brigadiers ... par un Capitaine Instructeur de l’École de Cavalerie de Saumur, Paris, 1860
- (in French) Victor Raoult Deslongchamps, Considérations sur la fièvre intermittente à l’École de Cavalerie de Saumur, École de Médecine, Paris, Collection des thèses, tome 10, 1839
- (in French) Maurice Durosoy, Saumur. Historique de l’École d’application de l’arme blindée et de la cavalerie, Paris, 1964, 150 p. (rééditions ultérieures)
- (in French) Pierre Garrigou Grandchamp (ed.), Saumur, l'école de cavalerie : histoire architecturale d'une cité du cheval militaire, Monum, Éditions du patrimoine, Paris, 2005, 325 p. ISBN 2-85822-795-0
- (in French) Robert Milliat, Le dernier carrousel. Défense de Saumur 1940 (illustrations d’un E.A.R. de l’École de cavalerie, ancien combattant de Saumur), B. Arthaud, Grenoble, Paris, 1945 (4th edition), 192 p.
- (in French) J. L. Tarneau, « Leçons élémentaires d'hygiène militaire, faites à l'école de cavalerie de Saumur, 1873 », Journal des Sciences militaires, 1874
- (in French) Charles-Maurice de Vaux, Les Écoles de cavalerie, Versailles, l'École militaire, l'École de Saint-Germain, Saint-Cyr, Saumur. Étude des méthodes d'équitation des grands maîtres, J. Rothschild, 1896
