= National Equestrian School =

French equestrian training school

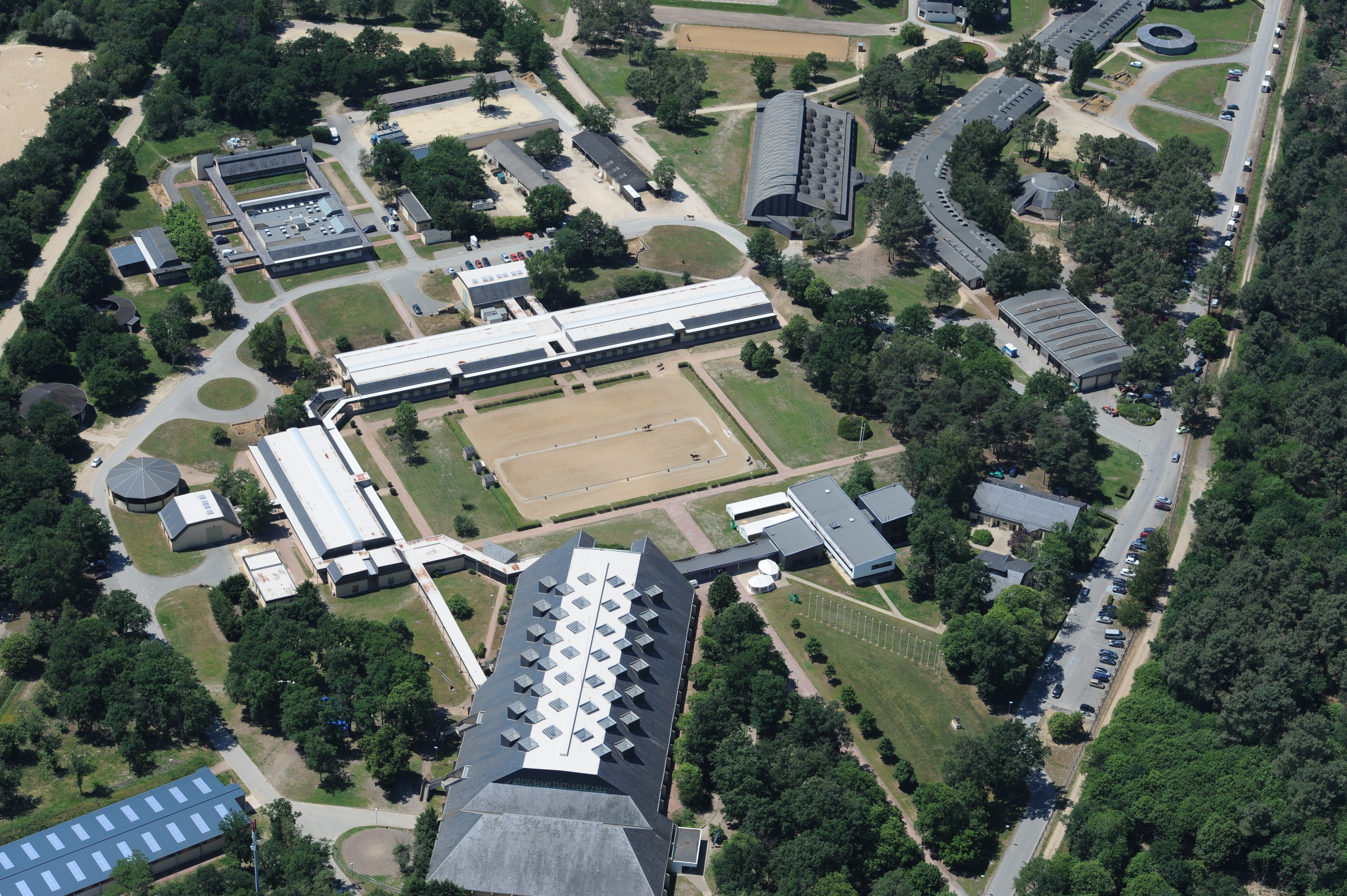
- Aerial view of the Grand Riding Hall and the Honor Arena of the National Equestrian School.

Location
- Saumur; France
- Coordinates: 47°15′47″N 0°08′20″W

Information
- Type: Public institution
- Established: May 16, 1972; 53 years ago
- Website: www.ifce.fr/en/cadre-noir/

The National Equestrian School (French: École nationale d'équitation, ENE) is a public establishment created in 1972 around the Cadre Noir in Saumur, France, with the aim of training senior equestrian executives. In 2010, it merged with Haras Nationaux to form the Institut français du cheval et de l'équitation.

== History ==
The School was founded in 1972 by decree to replace the Institut National d'Equitation, which was created in 1968. It continues the tradition of the Saumur Cavalry Officers' School.

The school was created in Saumur with the support of the town of Saumur and the General Council of Maine-et-Loire.

In 2010, it was merged with the Haras Nationaux to form the Institut français du cheval et de l'équitation.

== Mission ==
The ENE, which is part of the Institut français du cheval et de l'équitation, under the supervision of the Ministries of Agriculture and Sport, was created with the following missions:

- training and development of French riding professionals at the national level (instructors and teachers)
- organization and preparation for national and international competitions (particularly Olympic disciplines),
- participation in technical and pedagogical studies and research, and the creation of a documentation center in the field of equestrian teaching and practice
- preservation and presentation of traditional French equitation.

The school is the heir to the French equestrian tradition. It complements the Cadre Noir de Saumur, which trains military personnel and equestrians. Professors at the National Equestrian School train and perfect senior equestrian executives. The school hosts training courses for French and foreign teachers and competitors, welcoming 1,500 trainees. Thanks to the establishment, horses and riders have access to competitions, some of which are organized on the Terrefort and Verrie grounds.

Since 2003, the school has been one of four European schools in the Euroride network of equestrian training schools. In addition to ENE, the schools of Warendorf in Germany, Deurne in the Netherlands and Strömsholm in Sweden are also part of this network. Trainees spend 10 months at each of these schools.

== Infrastructure and employees ==
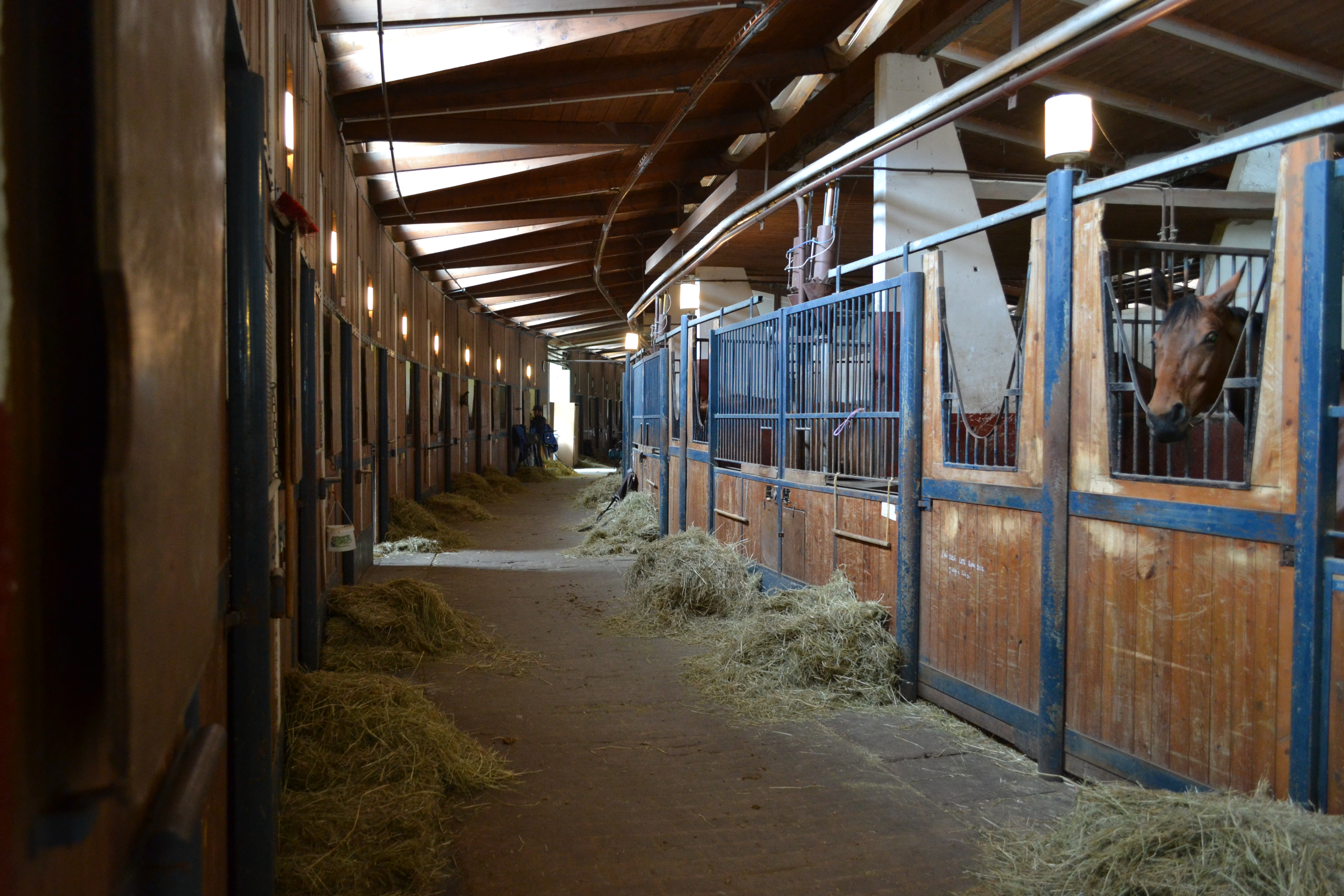
ENE's stables

The school is located on two sites: the 130-hectare Terrefort site, where the school's buildings and infrastructure are located, and the Verrie site, where the racecourse is used for international competitions, springs, and training courses.

In 2008, the school owned 330 horses, with between 400 and 500 more in its stables.

It has eighteen Olympic careers, 50 km of prepared tracks, several hundred obstacles, and seven Olympic riding arenas, including one of the largest in Europe. The school also boasts a veterinary clinic, a blacksmith's shop, an amphitheater, and a media library.

In 2008, the school employed 200 people, most of them civil servants. They include 45 teachers, around 60 grooms, 5 farriers, two veterinarians, and two nurses. Other staff are delegated to technical maintenance and administrative functions.

=== Directors of the National Equestrian School ===
Years	Name	Title
1968-1972	Colonel Challan-Belval	Director, Institut national d'équitation (Note: Former name of the National Equestrian School.)
1973-1978	Colonel Philippe O'Delant	
1978-1984	General Henri Dumont Saint-Priest	
1984-1988	Colonel Pierre Durand	
1989-1994	Mr Jean-Luc Lhemanne	
1994-1999	Christian Cambo	
2000-2005	Mr Hubert Comis	
2005-2008	Mr Jacques Thiolat	
since 2008	Mr Robert d'Artois	

== Famous students ==
- Constance Menard (1968-), professional dressage rider.

== Horses ==
ENE horses are purchased from breeders all over France, at the age of three and generally at regional competitions, thanks to a subsidy. The vast majority are Selles Français, along with a few Anglo-Arabs. After being put out to pasture, the horses join the young mounts' stables, where their breaking-in is confirmed and their aptitudes tested. At the age of four, they are oriented towards a particular discipline, then promoted at Société hippique française competitions by riders specialized in events for young horses aged four to six. After six years, they are distributed among the ENE students, each of whom has four horses specialized respectively in dressage, jumping, eventing, and saddling. The rare high-potential horses continue their careers in competition, recognizable by the “ENE*HN” suffix following their names: Donatello du Riveau, Crocus Jacob, Athlète de la Cour, and Free-Style are among these renowned mounts.

== Pegasus Award ==
At the initiative of and in partnership with the Académie Pégase, the French National Equestrian School has been awarding the Prix Pégase (ENE) since 1989, in recognition of work on horses and riding that has contributed to the widespread dissemination of equestrian culture.

== See also ==
- Cadre Noir
- French Equestrian Federation
