= La Roche-aux-Fées =

- The Fairies' Rock
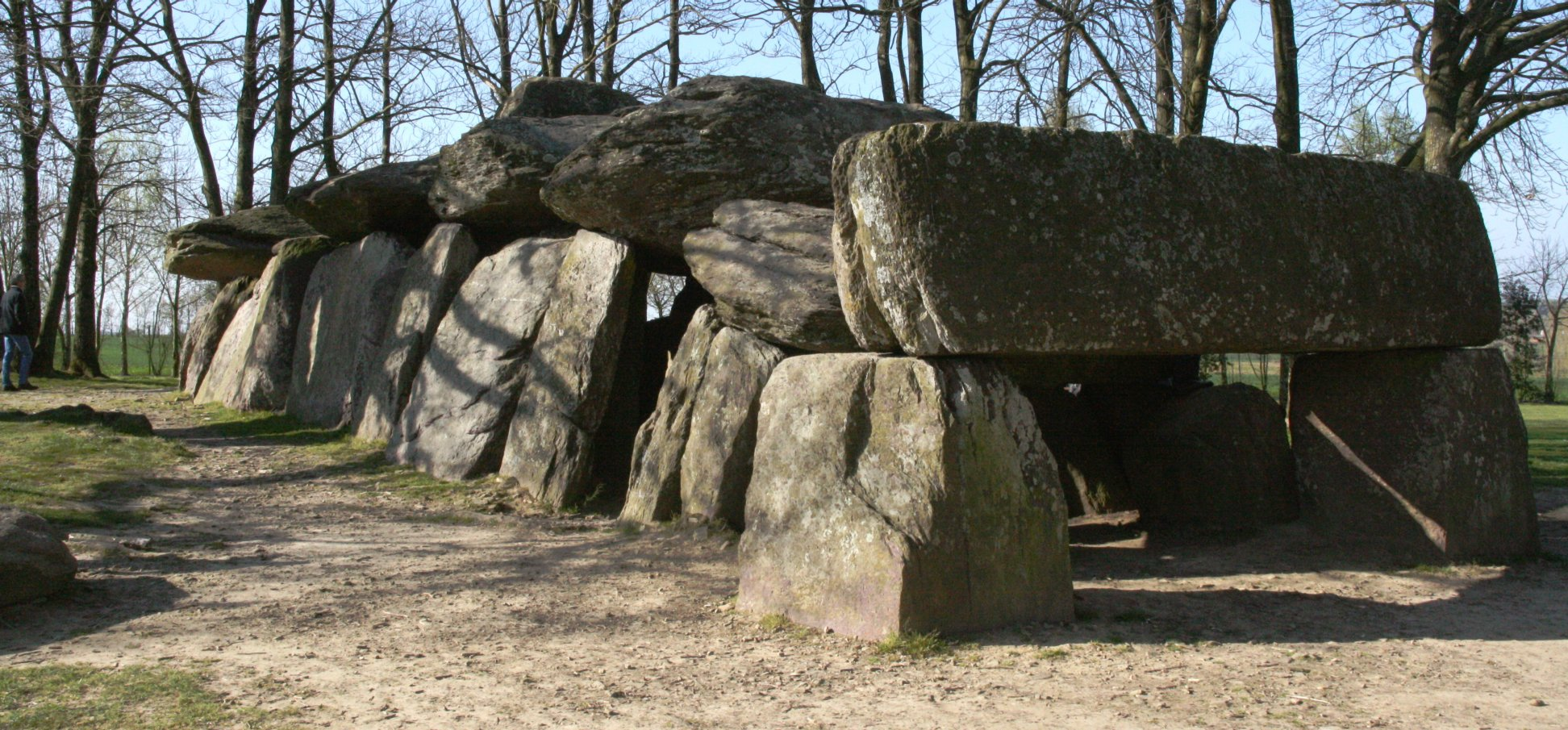
- The dolmen in 2007

- Location in Brittany, France
- 47.93639°N 1.40472°W
- Type: Dolmen
- Periods: Neolithic
- Location: Esse, Brittany, France

History
- Built: c. 2750 BC

Site notes
- Material: Stone
- Length: c. 20 meters

La Roche-aux-Fées (English: The Fairies' Rock) is a Neolithic gallery grave, or dolmen, located in the commune of Essé, in the French department of Ille-et-Vilaine in Brittany. Its name comes from a legend that claims that the stones were placed by fairies. The dolmen consists of more than forty stones forming a corridor four times longer than wide. Its northwest–southeast axis is on an alignment with sunrise at the winter solstice.

== Description ==
The tomb is one of the most famous and largest Neolithic dolmens in Brittany. It consists of a covered passage of stone blocks, with roofing stones laid across them. It is around 20 metres long, and there are around 48 blocks, of which the heaviest weighs around 45 tonnes. the interior is divided into two separate chambers. The entrance is aligned with the rising sun at the winter solstice. The original structure would have been covered with a mound of stones and earth. It is thought to date from between 3000 and 2500 BC.

== See also ==
- Prehistory of France
