= Cadre Noir =

Corps of riding instructors at the French National Equestrian School

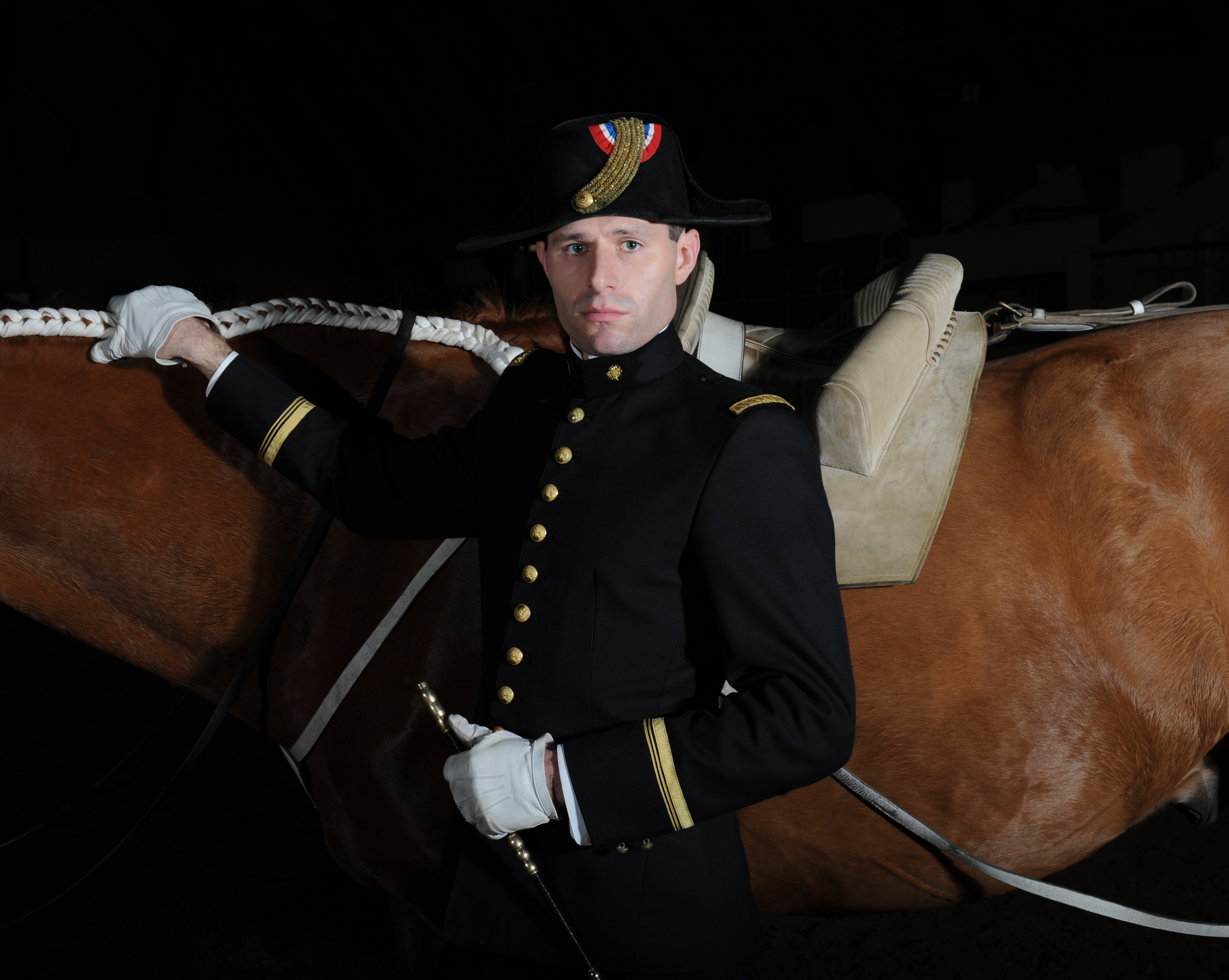
Écuyer of the Cadre Noir

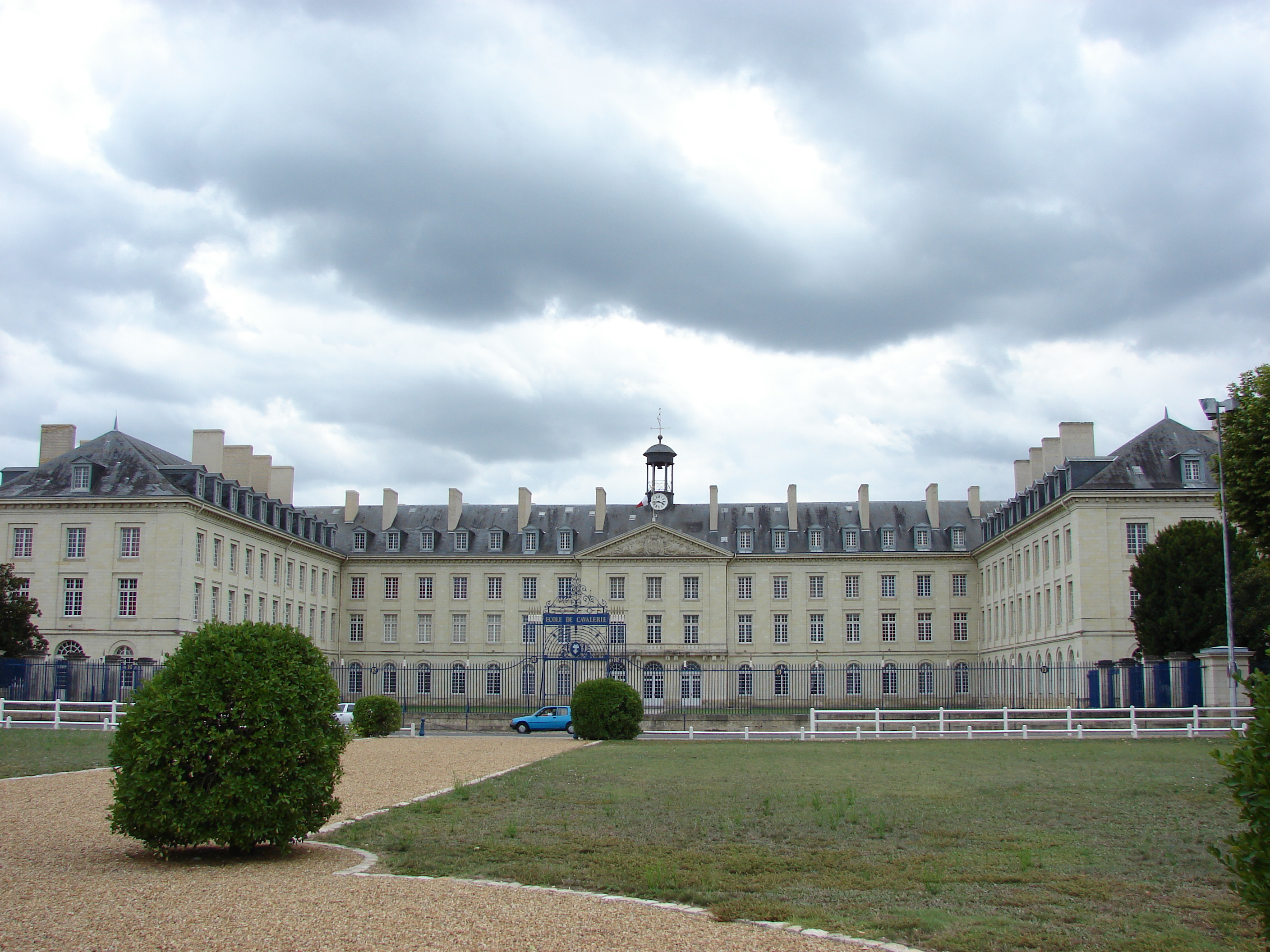
Former Cadre Noir cavalry school in Saumur

The Cadre Noir (French: [kadʁ nwaʁ]; English: Black Cadre) is a corps of écuyers, or instructors, at the French military riding academy École Nationale d'Équitation at Saumur in western France, founded in Versailles before transferring to Saumur in 1828. During the Second World War, the premises of the school were occupied by German forces and the remaining instructors and horses were moved temporarily to Fontainebleau. The school today also performs as an equestrian display team. Its name comes from the black uniforms that are still in use today. It is one of the "Big Four", the most prestigious classical riding academies in the world.

== History ==
The historic role of the Saumur Cavalry School was to provide training for the officers and non-commissioned officers of the French cavalry. The style of equitation characteristic of the school was first taught by François Robichon de La Guérinière, the French riding master to King Louis XV and author of the manual École de Cavalerie published in 1731. La Guérinière perfected the previous 17th-century methods of Antoine de Pluvinel and Louis de Nestier. In 1843, François Baucher introduced his method into the school. This event marked the beginning of a small "war" between the vicomte d'Aure (head of the school) and Baucher, which continued for several years.

After World War II the mounted element of the French Army had been reduced to a few squadrons of North African spahis (disbanded in 1962) and the primarily ceremonial Cavalry of the Republican Guard. While the need for a purely military riding academy had almost vanished, the international prestige of French horsemanship ensured the survival of the Saumur training centre in the form of a national riding school under the Ministry of Sports.

Accordingly, in 1972, the National School of Équitation was constituted around the Cadre Noir, which provided its core teaching staff. Today, there are about 50 horses and a team of elite riders, usually limited to 22. The members of the Cadre Noir have either civilian or military status. Military and civilian riders are distinguished by the insignia on their collar: a grenade for the military or a sun for the civilians. The military members can be either officers or non-commissioned officers. Some of the riders have reached the highest level of international sport, being Olympic gold-medallists or world champions.

The Cadre Noir mainly uses Thoroughbreds, Anglo-Arabians, Hanoverians and Selle Français, but also keeps Lusitano horses to demonstrate the 16th- and 17th-century baroque style of riding. The Thoroughbreds and Anglo Arabians are used for the Grand Prix dressage, and perform individually, pas de deux (two horses), pas de trois (three horses), and dûe quantité (four or more horses). They may be either displayed in hand or ridden.

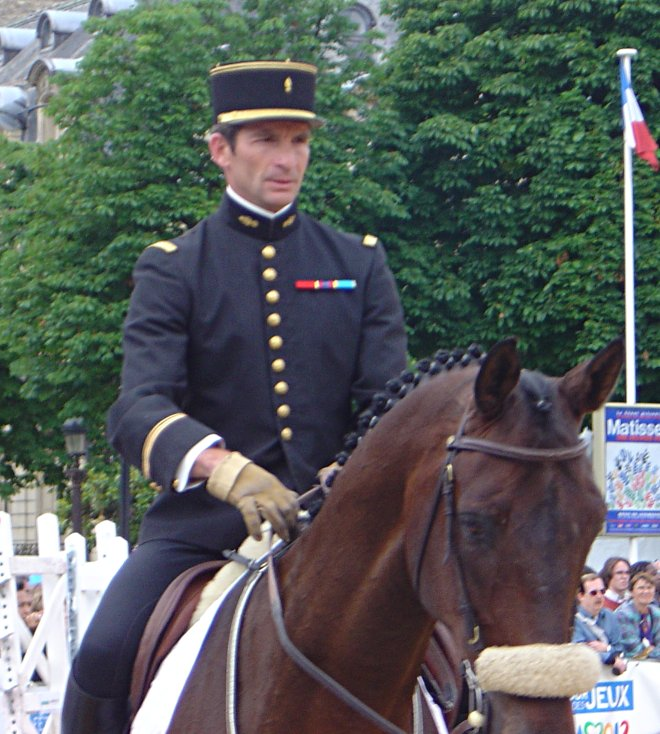
Olympic champion Didier Courrèges

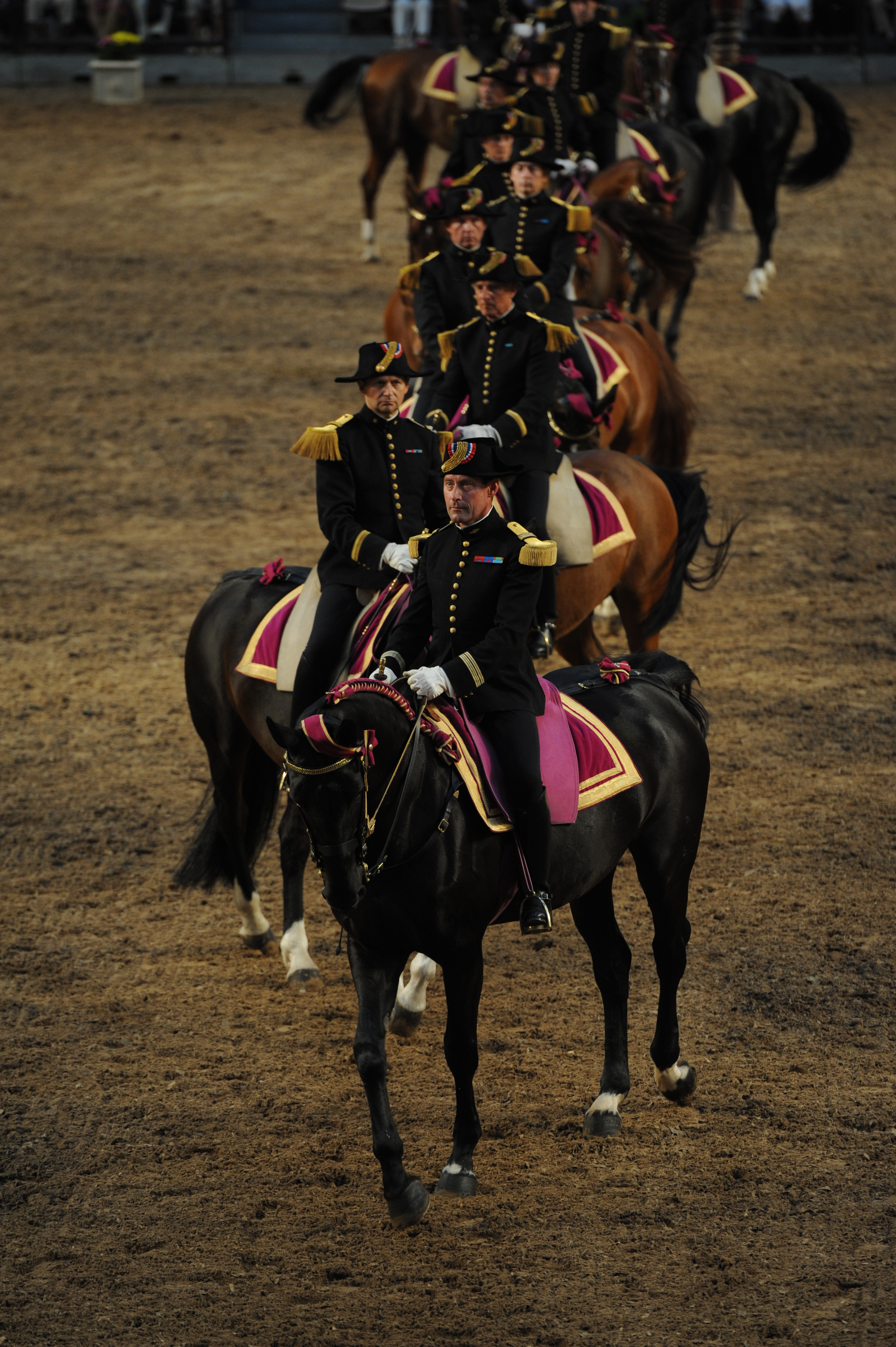
Cadre Noir in gala uniform

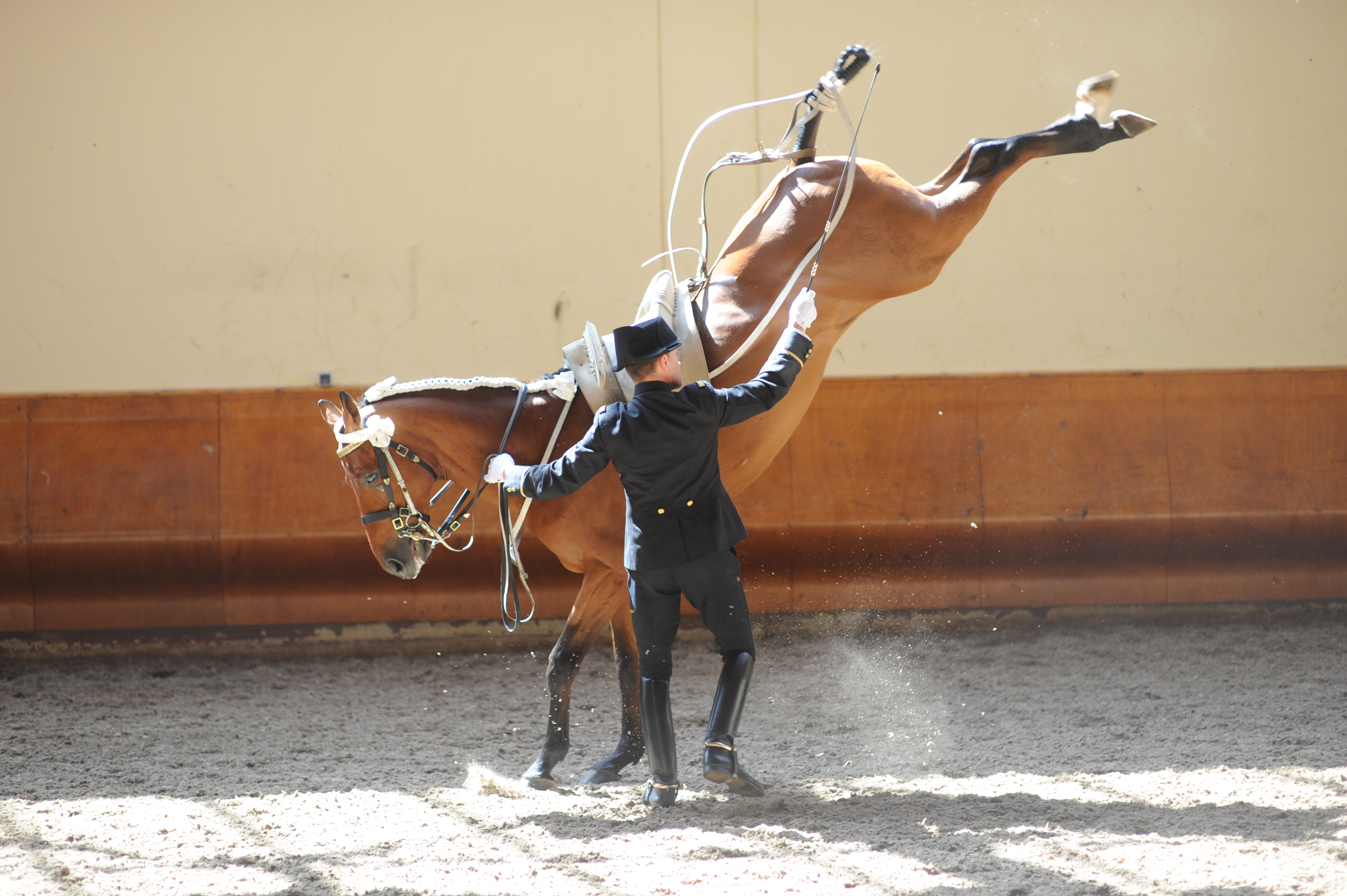
Croupade

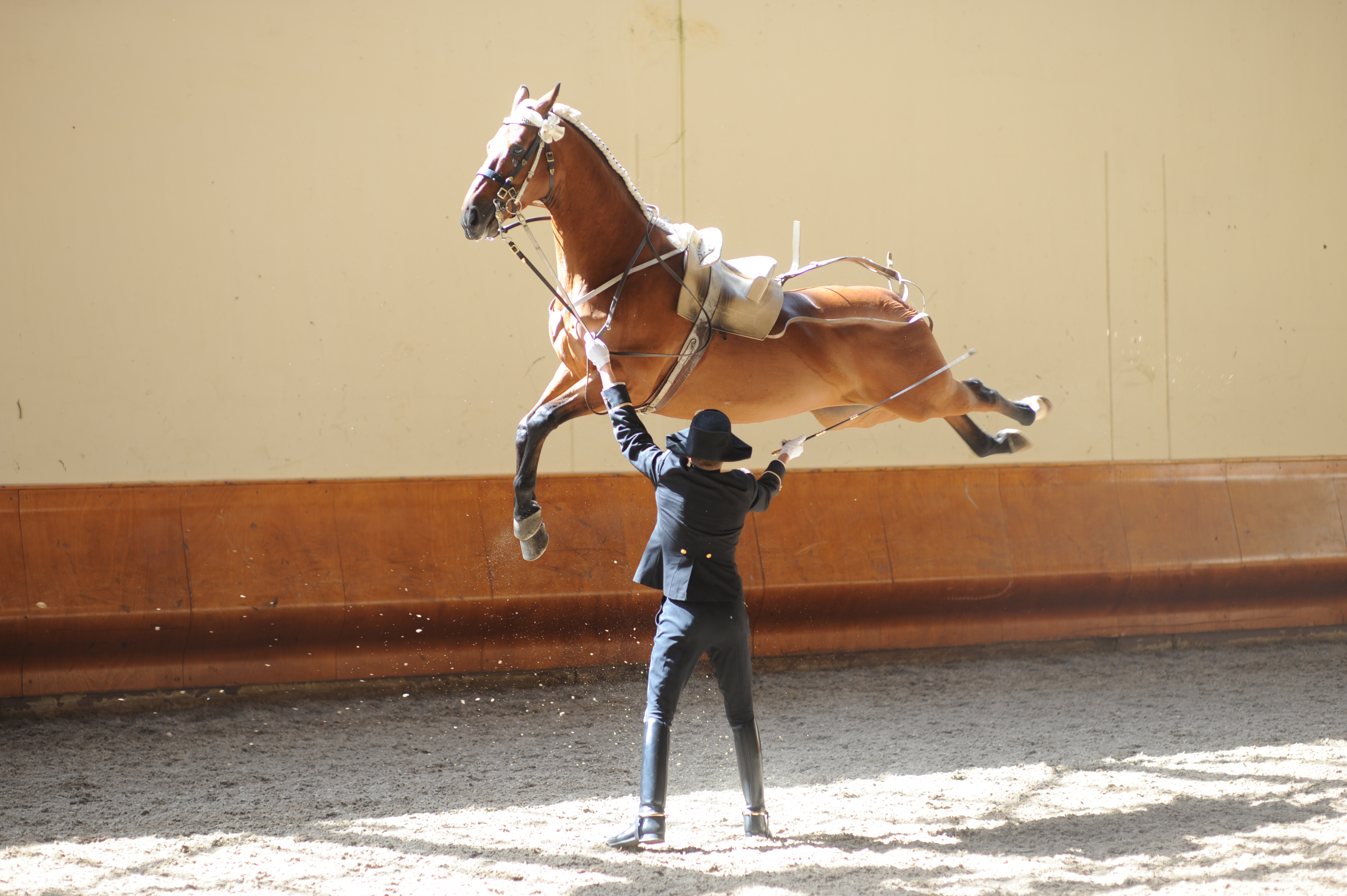
Cabriole

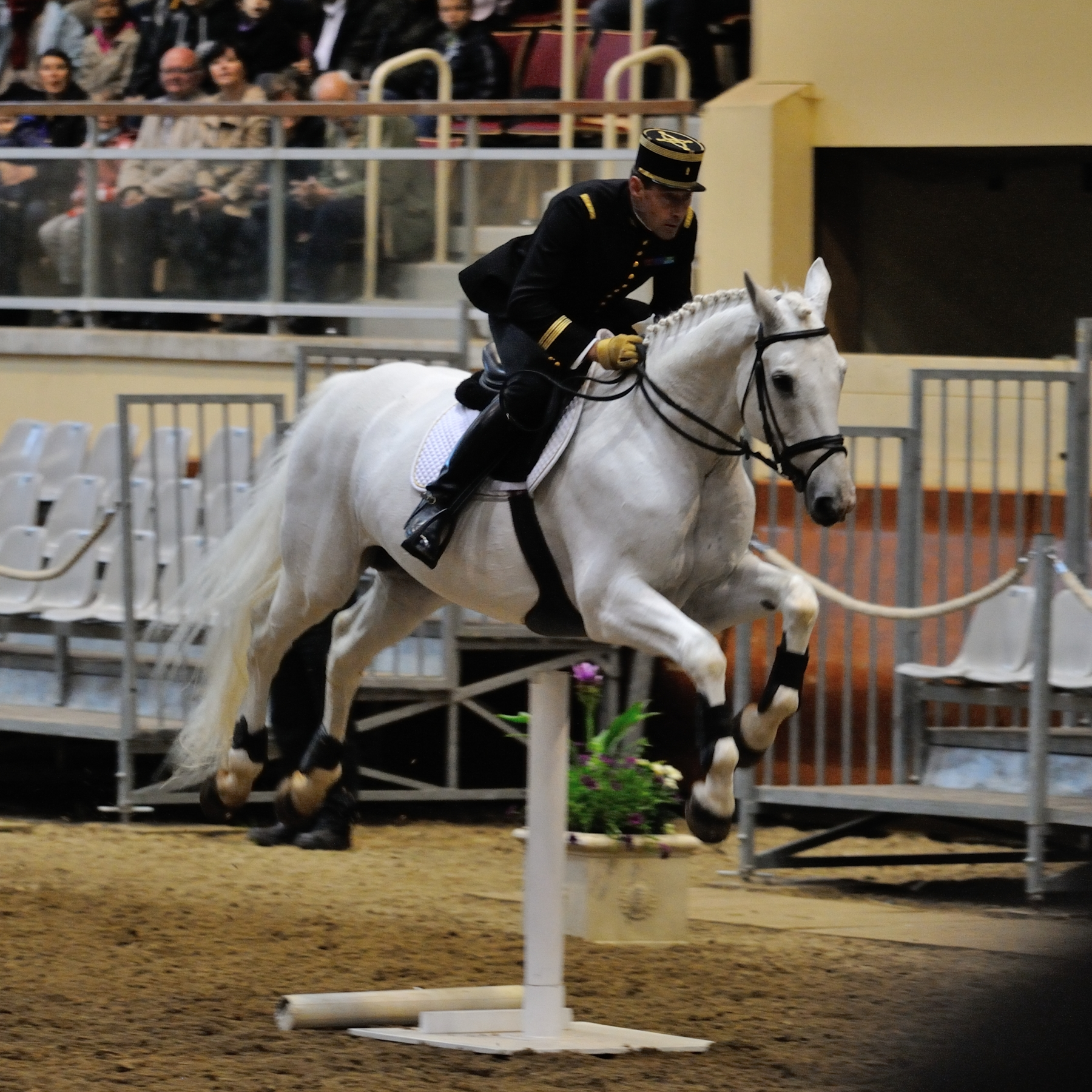
Jumping display over a single upright pole

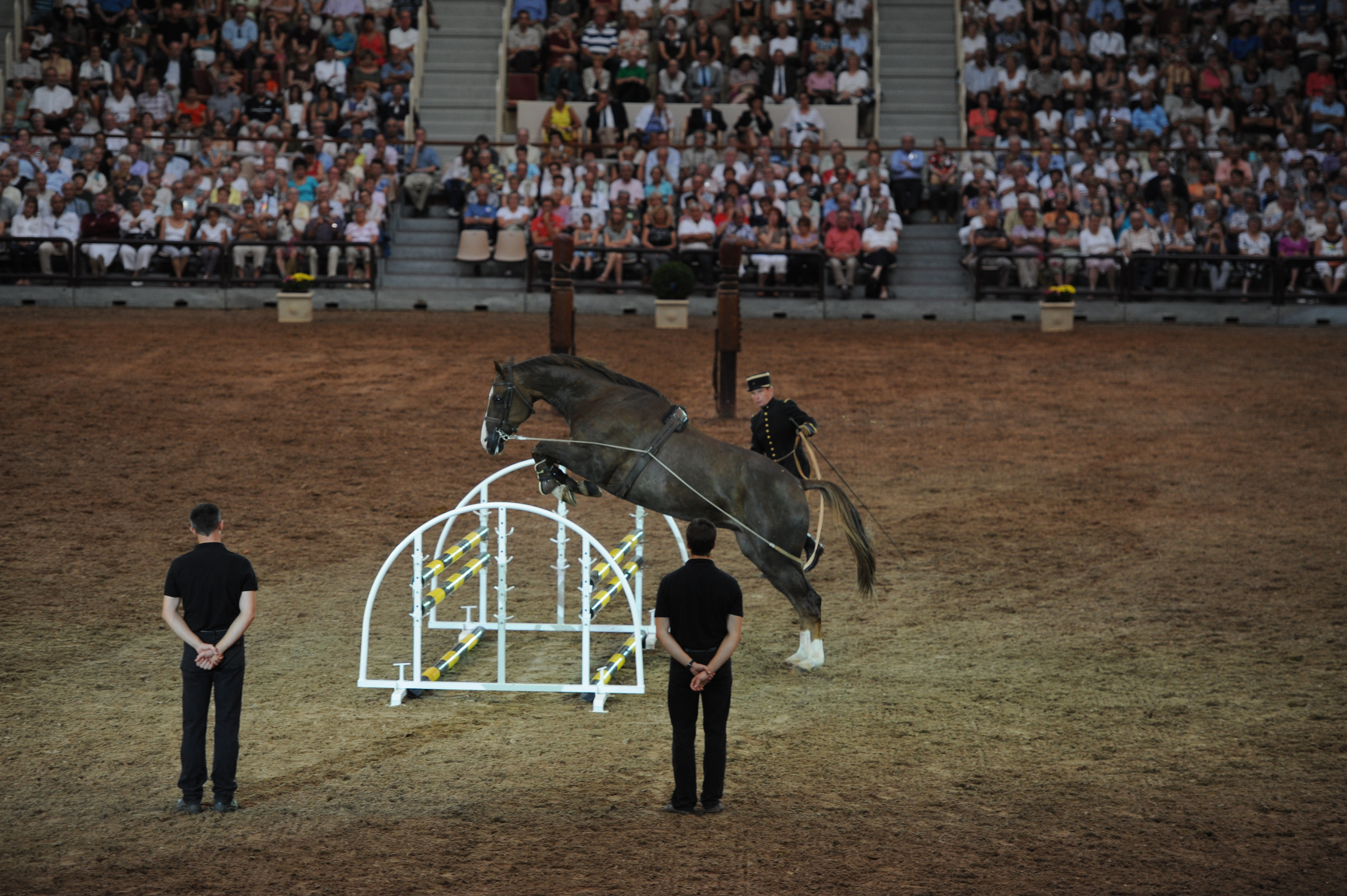
Longeing demonstration over fences

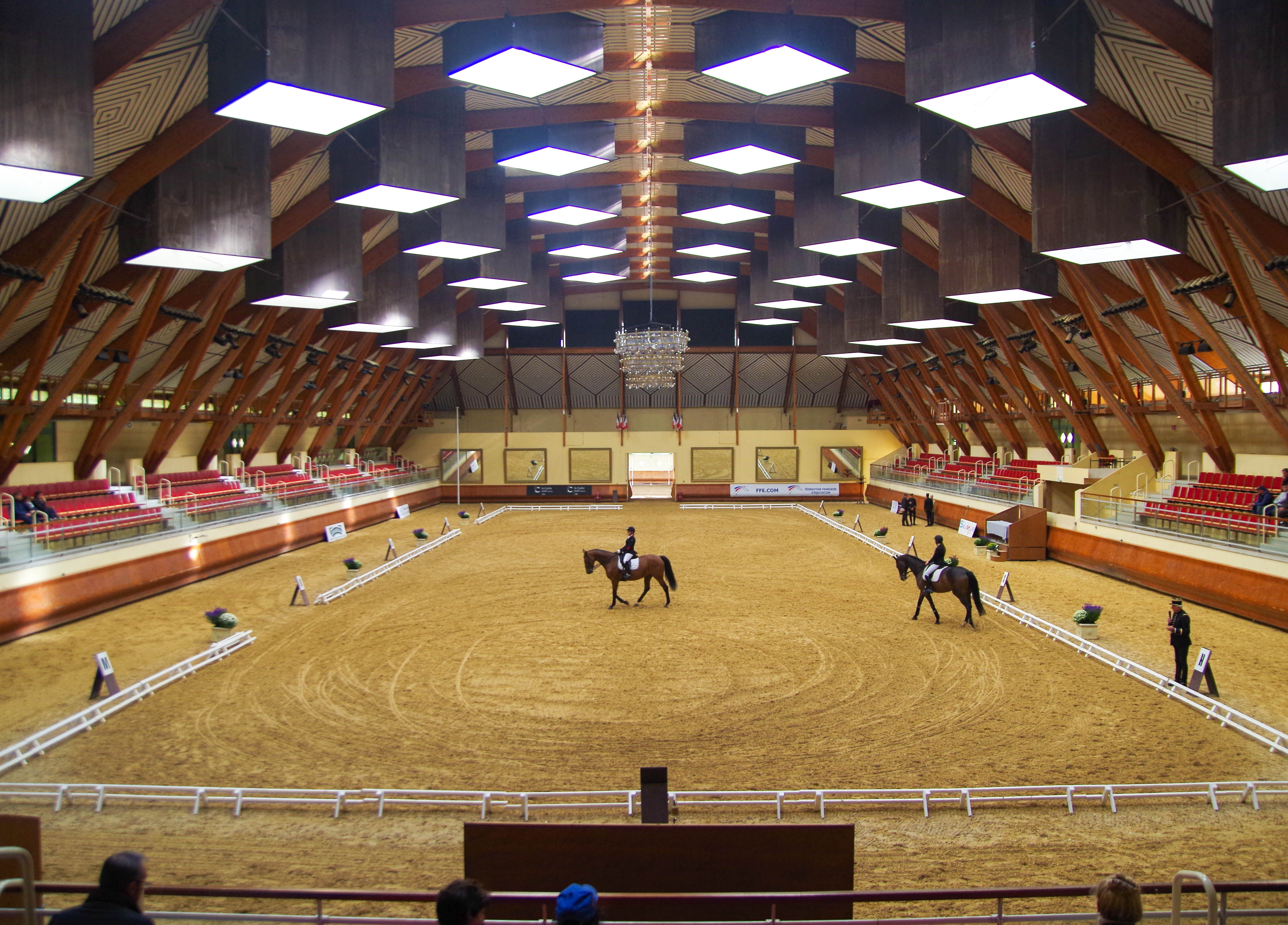
The Grand manège des écuyers

The Selle Français are used to display the 'airs above the ground.'

== See also ==
Other "Big Four" academies:

- Spanish Riding School of Vienna
- Portuguese School of Equestrian Art
- Royal Andalusian School of Equestrian Art

== Bibliography ==
- Jacques Perrier et Durand (dir.), L'Épopée du Cadre noir de Saumur, Lavauzelle, 1994, 110 p. (ISBN 2-7025-0331-4)
- Roger Gaborieau (ill. Alain Laurioux), Le Cadre noir de Saumur, École nationale d'équitation, 1996, 39 p.
- Patrice Franchet d'Espèrey, Le Cadre noir de Saumur, Paris, Arthaud, 1999, 159 p. (ISBN 2-7003-1211-2)
