= Gabriel Calloet-Kerbrat =

Breton Catholic agronomist and writer

- Born: Between 1616 and 1620
- Died: June 20, 1697
- Education: Prytanée national militaire
- Occupations: Agriculturist, writer, engineer

Gabriel Calloet de Querbrat (or Calloet-Kerbrat, according to the Breton spelling he sometimes used), was born at an unknown date between 1616 and 1620 (Note: p. 243. Vincent Audren de Kerdrel proposed a birth around 1600, because he assumed that Calloet was already of a certain age when he became general counsel in 1642. This is the date most often used.) in Kerbrat-en-Servel (now in the commune of Lannion, Côtes-d'Armor), and died in Lannion on June 30, 1697, aged around 80. He was a Breton Catholic agriculturist and writer. Considered to have introduced the idea of zootechnical improvement through cross-breeding to France, he played an important role in the establishment of hôpitaux généraux (lit. French for general hospitals) in the seventeenth century.

== Agricultural experiments ==
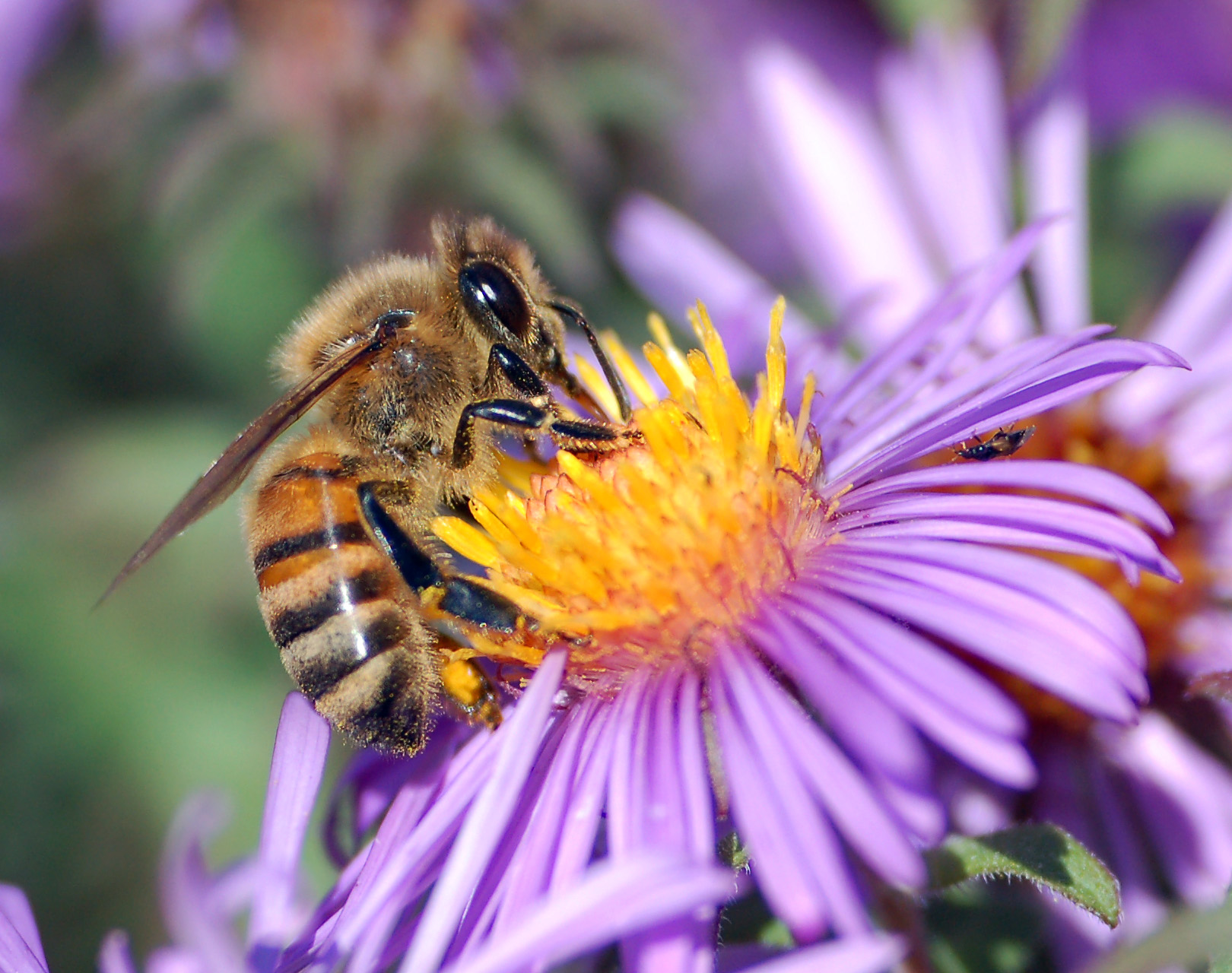
Calloet-Kerbrat had a passion for bees.

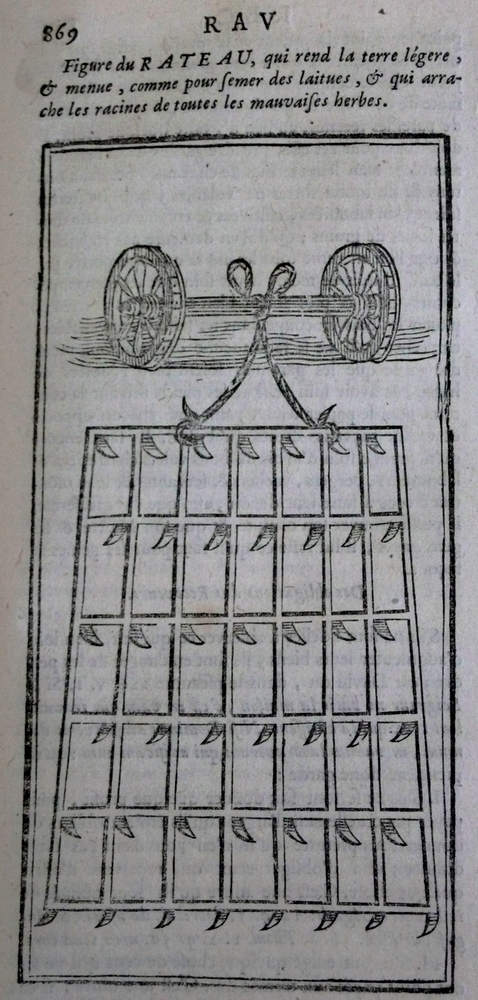
Calloet-Kerbrat's "rateau" (rake). Plate from Noël Chomel's Dictionnaire Oeconomique, 1760 edition.

Gabriel Calloet-Kerbrat, a member of the minor nobility of Trégor, was educated at the Jesuit college in La Flèche, before studying law in Paris. (Note: p. 244.) On July 21, 1642, he became general counsel at the Chambre des Comptes de Bretagne in Nantes, a position he held as a successor, most probably from his relative Antoine Calloet. On July 10, 1646, he was appointed general counsel for the September session, an office newly created by Louis XIV, which he held until 1664. Finally, in 1647, he became State Counselor. His parliamentary career has never been studied, and for this period he can only be credited with writing a eulogy in Latin for Cardinal de La Rochefoucauld, around 1645.

During the 1650s, he devoted himself to agricultural experimentation on his property. He was also passionate about honey production, owning a large orchard and over 800 beehives. To better understand their way of life, he developed the first known glass beehive, and took great pride in having "learned how to manage and heal them in a way that Virgil and all the others who have written about them never did". (Note: p. 126.) But he was also involved in sheep, goat, horse and cattle breeding, and cultivated using his methods, his land yielded, according to his estimates, a third more than his neighbors. He successfully experimented with the use of winter sainfoin, i.e. gorse, for fodder, which he would later propagate, and for which he invented a harrow specially designed to loosen the soil so that it could be planted in winter, on a field that had been used for barley. (Note: p. 125.) His later writings bear witness to his direct knowledge of agricultural matters, as he sometimes used Breton vocabulary to designate certain plants and practices. (Note: pp. 243–244.) He was visibly familiar with horse breeding, as the Breton bishoprics of Tréguier and Léon were major horse exporters at the time. (Note: p. 124)

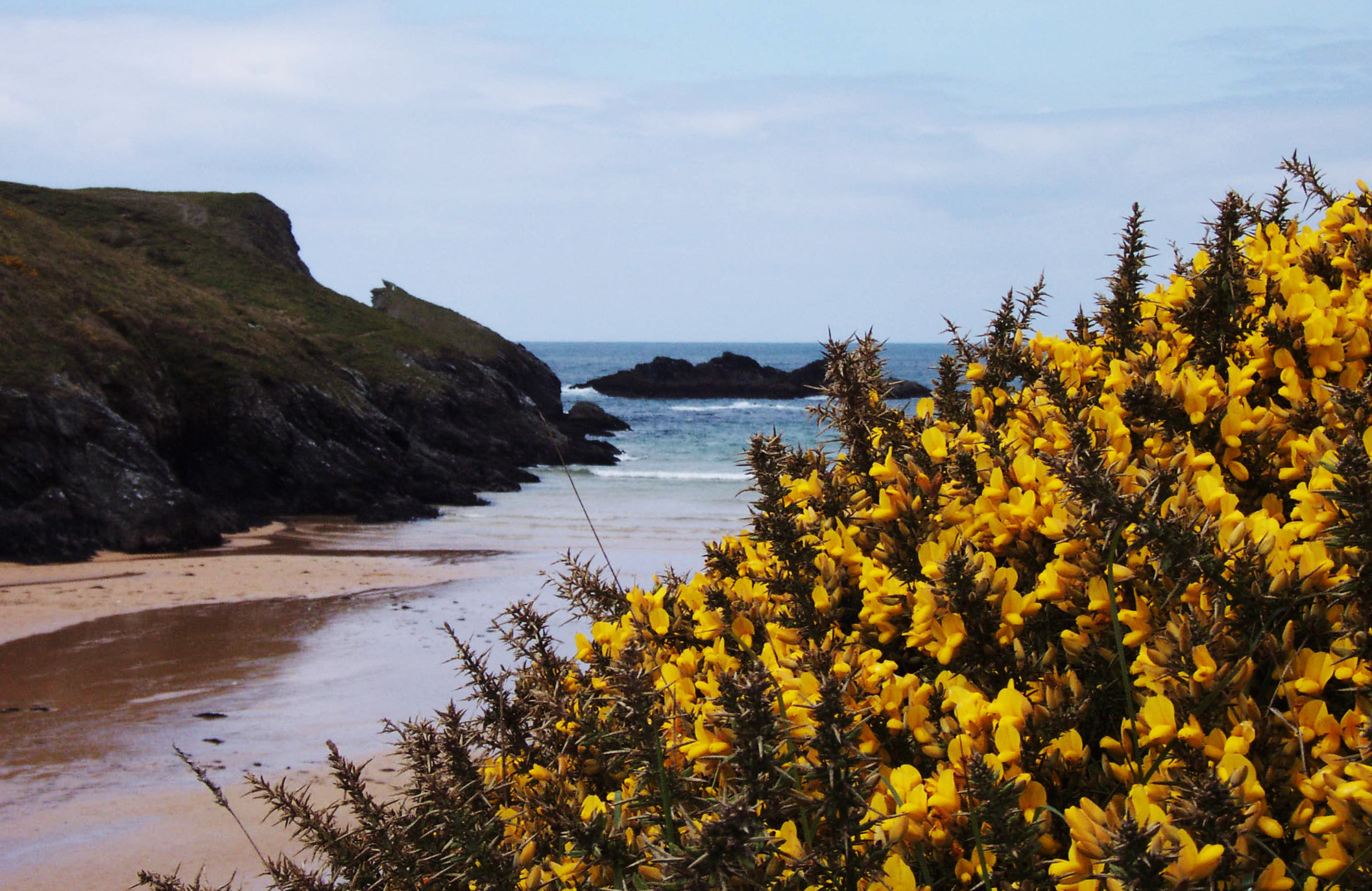
Gorse on a Breton beach. Calloet-Kerbrat had invented a machine to extract fodder.

Calloet-Kerbrat also invented a machine for crushing gorse to extract fodder for livestock, often cited in agronomic literature. He particularly recommended using this plant for newborn foals, as well as cows and sheep. This practice, along with the use of this machine, seems to have spread to Brittany during the eighteenth century, and his feeding advice still appears in nineteenth-century veterinary literature. Among his inventions, it is also worth mentioning his "loge", used to store turnips during the winter, and his turnip chopper for feeding cattle, which are among the first agricultural machines described by their inventor. His drawing plates were regularly reproduced in the 18th century, notably in the Maison rustique, which ensured their wide distribution.

This desire for practical experimentation is explicit in Calloet-Kerbrat's work, even if it coexisted with other forms of establishing proof: he consulted ancient authorities, mainly Aristotle and Hippocrates, and modern ones, although he was wary of doctors, (with the exception of Juan Huarte), he consulted archives and listened to the opinions of competent people. After listening to the advice of the women of his village on the effect of different wind directions on the birth of roosters, Calloet-Kerbrat conducted experiments on the influence of salt crystals on humidity, and made observations on hair curling, in the process indicting the cost and unhealthiness of wigs. He concluded, in line with his theory, that males from warm, dry semen were favored by north and east winds. On the other hand, when he hadn't experimented with a procedure he reported, he pointed out that it could be used to select the coat of an unborn foal: a carpet of the desired color was painted, and the mare was covered with it from mating to birth. This procedure, applied to sheep, was already used by the prophet Joshua. In all seriousness, then, his approach was that of seventeenth-century science, where experimentation took precedence over the citation of authorities.

== Agricultural publications ==
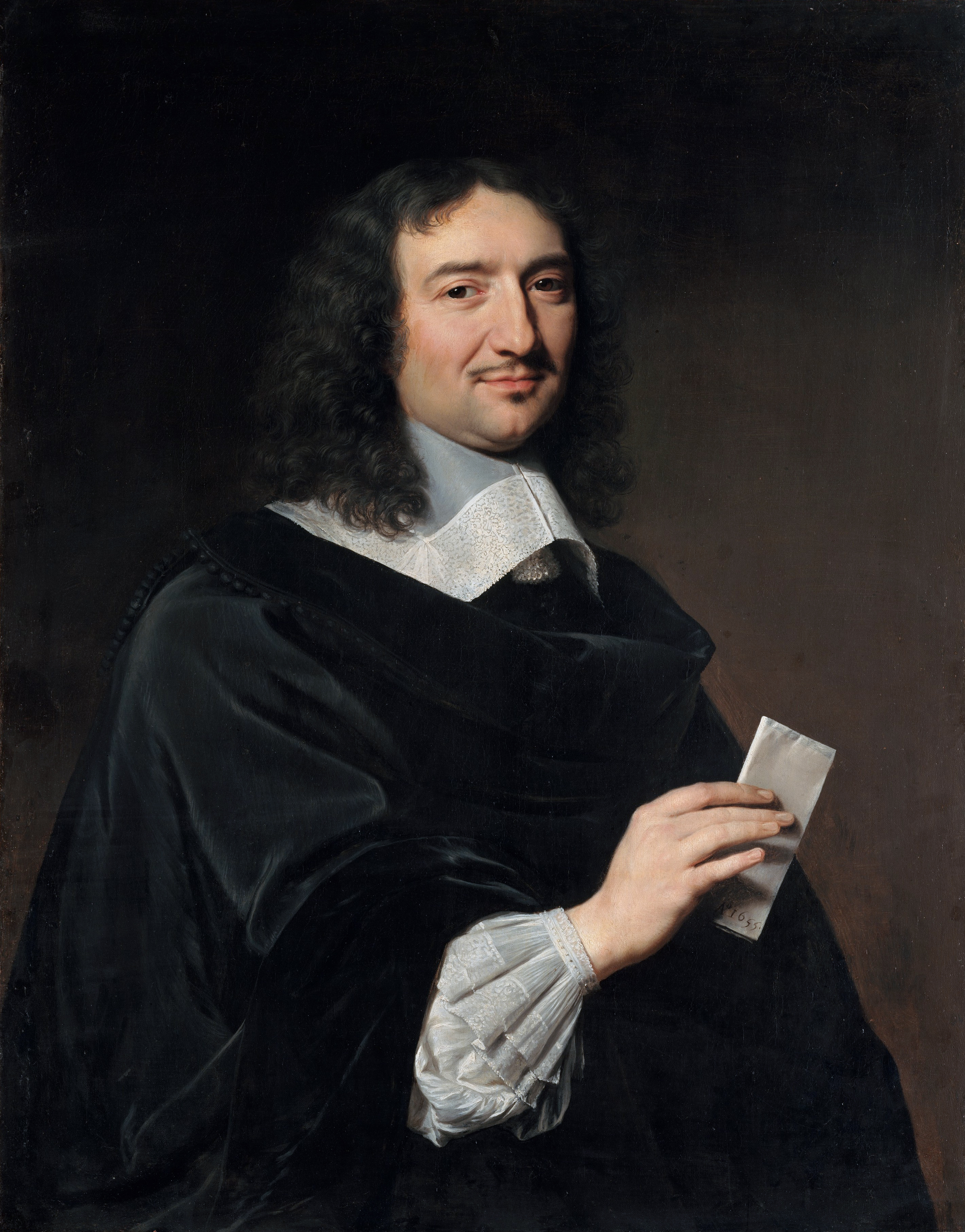
Colbert, painted by Philippe de Champaigne in 1666, the year Gabriel Calloet-Kerbrat presented him with his work.

Ruined by a lawsuit, Calloet-Kerbrat moved to Paris. Here, from 1666 to 1680, he published a series of pamphlets on the zootechnical improvement of goats, sheep, cows and horses, although he was happy to deal with related subjects such as the choice of sex for children, criticism of the wearing of wigs, advertising for his universal remedy and criticism of legal wrangling (one of the Company of the Blessed Sacrament's favorite themes). These were all short texts, written in a direct, Olivier de Serres-like style, with a touch of humor and numerous references to personal experience and classical culture. Audren de Kerdrel, his first biographer, noted the familiar tone with which Calloet-Kerbrat addressed great people, including the king, attributing this trait to his Breton origins. It could also be attributed to the company's practices, where precedence based on rank was ruled out.

Calloet-Kerbrat sought to meet Colbert. Several historians considered Calloet-Kerbrat to be the inspiration behind the Controller-General of Finances's policy of improving livestock breeding, and agronomy historian André Jean Bourde himself wrote: "One cannot discuss Colbert's activity in the field of agriculture without saying something about a remarkable agronomic personality, Calloet-Querbrat or Calloet de Kerbrat". (Note: p. 122) Traces of their meeting are nonetheless lacking, but it is indeed probable, since the Bibliothèque nationale preserves a letter, dated February 6, 1666, in which the latter requested an appointment with Colbert, on the recommendation of the Duke of Mazarin, Lieutenant General of Brittany: "Poür ces chevaux, brebis, et vaches, M. le Duc Mazarin, m'a demandé des mémoires, qu'il m'a dit avoir donné vous, et que vous désiriez me parler" ("For these horses, sheep and cows, M. le Duc Mazarin, asked me for some memoirs, which he told me he had given you, and that you wished to speak to me"). He referred to his first pamphlets, which had just been published. One of them was dedicated to the minister, who received a specially printed copy on vellum – now kept at the Bibliothèque nationale – in which Calloet-Kerbrat reminded him that he had written the memoirs at his request.

Calloet-Kerbrat's proposed solutions were inspired by Colbertian ideas. He suggested, for example, sending a flandrin bull to each parish, to crossbreed with local cows to create a larger, more fertile breed, and granting their guardians tax privileges, as was done for stallions in Poitou. Colbert's interest in horses began in 1659, followed by cattle in 1662. He believed in the possibility of improvement through crossbreeding with imported breeding stock, since he was concerned with bringing stallions, rams and bulls to France. On this point, he agreed with the ideas of Calloet-Kerbrat, against the prevailing idea that the animal is a simple reflection of the soil, and that crossbreeding led to rapid degeneration. In other respects, however, he was at the opposite end of the spectrum from the Breton agronomist: while Calloet-Kerbrat proposed doubling the amount of grazed land in the kingdom, Colbert passed the Edict of Triage (1667), which allocated one-third of uncultivated land to the seigneurs – and if there were no seigneurs, to the King – who would generally transform it into cultivated land rather than pasture. Calloet-Kerbrat's influence on Colbertian practice is therefore probable, but limited.

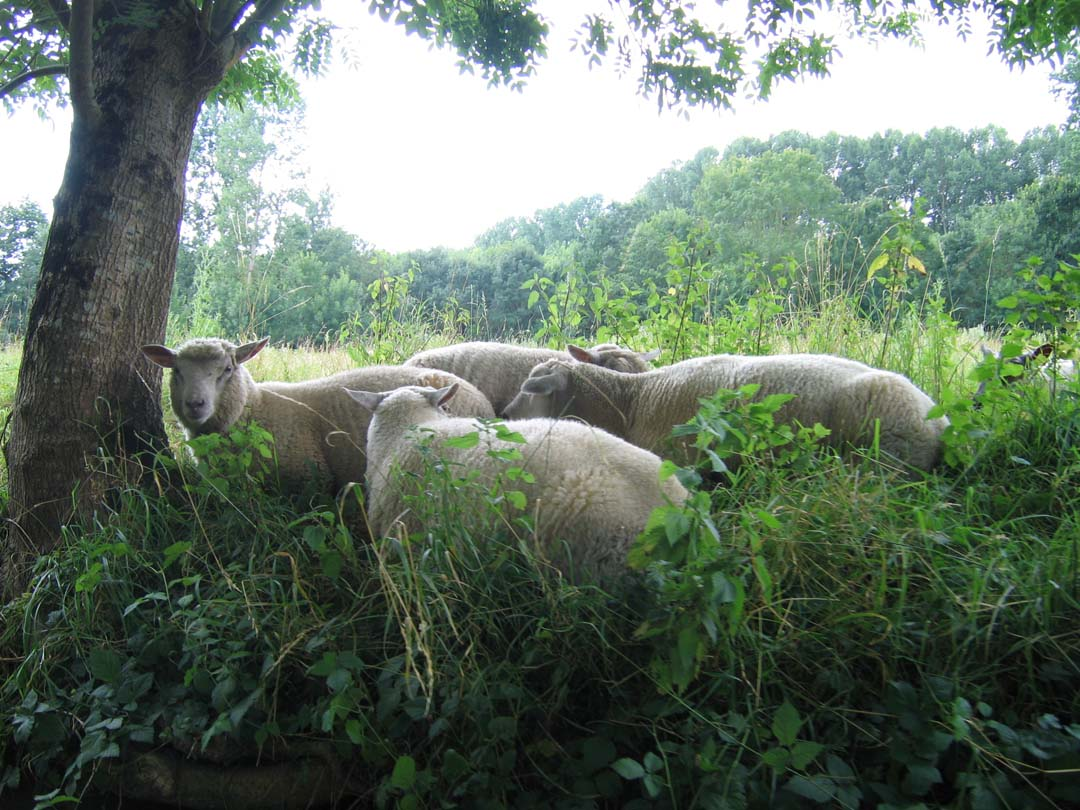
Sheep in the Marais Poitevin. Calloet-Kerbrat was interested in the animals brought in by the Dutch, who were working to drain the marsh.

Disdaining local breeds, Calloet-Kerbrat was well informed about breeding methods abroad. He praised the Flandrines cows, imported to Poitou by Bradley's Flemings working to drain the Marais Poitevin; he offered the first French-language description of English sheep, and their successful crossbreeding with Spanish animals and he also mentioned Dutch sheep. His association with the ambassador of Denmark, a country where agricultural science was more advanced than in France, may have played a role in introducing him to the practices of that country, which he often cited as a reference.

Calloet-Kerbrat was thus the first theorist of cross-breeding in France. Renaissance agriculturalists, such as Estienne's Praedium Rusticum (1554), Jean Liébault's Maison rustique (Rustic house)(1564), or Olivier de Serres' Théâtre d'agriculture (Theater of Agriculture) (1600), (Note: Théâtre d'agriculture et Ménage des champs (Theatre of agriculture and field maintenance)... In which we see clearly and precisely the art of using and cultivating the earth, in all that concerns it, according to its different qualities and various climates, both according to the doctrine of the Ancients and by experience.) did not consider this possibility. In keeping with the century's medical thinking, Calloet-Kerbrat placed his thoughts within the Aristotelian framework of hot and cold, dry and wet. At the time, it was widely accepted that animals imported from cold countries degenerated when transported to warm countries. The Breton agronomist, on the other hand, postulated that the initial warmth of each species, linked to its original origin, was invariable – and he took pains to demonstrate that the animals he proposed importing, such as Danish horses, originally came from warm countries. In so doing, he rejected the aforementioned idea of the animal as a mere reflection of the soil. Some authors, notably Solleysel, had already admitted this possibility for horses, but Calloet-Kerbrat seems to be the first to have extended it to non-noble animals, such as cows, goats and sheep. It's possible that the reluctance of seventeenth-century French thinkers to imagine this possibility was linked to social structures: asserting that non-noble animals could be improved by cross-breeding suggested that this could also apply to humans, something difficult to admit even when the aristocratic ideology of the time tended to regard the nobility as a race.

Calloet-Kerbrat's pamphlets were far shorter than the standard agronomic works of the time, in an explicit bid for wide distribution:

When the rich do not have these establishments made, they must at least send this book to their farmers, to teach them how to make more profit than they do from their common cattle, sparing their pastures in summer, & increasing their fodder in winter, by this healthy winter hay & other means marked above.

Calloet-Kerbrat developed a complete agricultural system (distribution of land use, choice of crops and relationships between them). He set himself apart by proposing that livestock farming should be seen not as a necessary evil – as the expression was commonly used – but as a source of profit in its own right. Better still, he suggested that agriculture should be organized around livestock farming, rather than the other way around.

This desire to transform the agricultural system was dominated by Calloet-Kerbrat's central idea: the fight against poverty. He saw his proposals as likely to enrich the peasants, and consequently reduce the burden of taxation on them: "the people are no better off, however fertile the land, if it is exhausted by the Taille and other subsidies without giving them the means to make some extraordinary profit, which is what neighboring states are working on", he wrote, not without lending credence to confidences allegedly made to him by the Maréchal de la Meilleraye – a close associate of the Company of the Blessed Sacrament.

In the eighteenth century, Calloet-Kerbrat's ideas were widely used in agronomic literature, sometimes reproduced in full in works without his name always appearing. In particular, he was featured in Noël Chomel's Dictionnaire œconomique (1708) and in the Nouvelle maison rustique (1772), while Henri Grégoire praised him in the introduction to his edition of Olivier de Serres' works.

== Company of the Blessed Sacrament ==
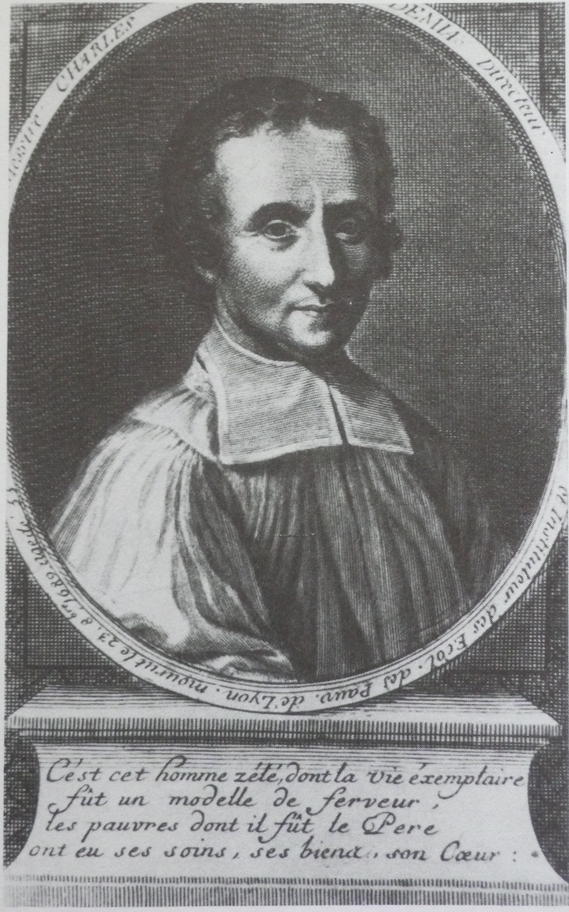
Charles Démia, Calloet-Kerbrat's friend and correspondent, anonymous Frontispiece portrait of his Trésor clérical, second edition, 1694.

In Paris, Calloet-Kerbrat was in contact with Antoine Barrillon, Marquis de Morangis, who had been an influential member of the Company of the Blessed Sacrament. He became secretary of the charitable assembly of the parish of Saint-Sulpice, which continued the work of this company after it was banned by Louis XIV in 1666. From 1670 onwards, he and two other former members, the Reverend Fathers André Guevarre and Honoré Chaurand – a well-known preacher – launched a campaign for the creation of general hospitals and charity offices for the poor, based on the model proposed in the royal edict of 1662. They quickly won the support of the governors of the Paris hospices, notably Loyseau, who wanted to promote the expansion of a hospital network to avoid taking in the poor from the provinces, and thus lighten their own financial burdens. This campaign, promoted by the Jesuits, was coordinated by Calloet-Kerbrat. (Note: Historian Tim McHugh mistakenly identified Calloet-Kerbrat as a priest.)

The campaign to develop general hospitals met with some success, with promoters attributing to it almost one hundred and twenty creations – some of them short-lived – including those in Quimper, Roanne, Saint-Étienne and Bourg-en-Bresse. The method devised by Guévarre and Calloet-Kerbrat was fairly rushed: the missionaries spent three days in the town, made numerous approaches to wealthy people and collected funds to create the new hospital "à la capucine", i.e. with very limited means, as the 17th century put it. In practice, this led to the large-scale confinement of beggars, as studied by Michel Foucault in his Histoire de la folie à l'âge classique (Madness and civilization).

Calloet-Kerbrat also distributed a drug he considered a panacea for all illnesses. He was quite successful: on November 17, 1670, Dominique de Ligny, bishop of Meaux, proposed to the Assemblée du Clergé that his pamphlets and medicines be distributed to all parishes in France; François Faure, bishop of Amiens, relayed the information to his diocese; and Balthasar Grangier de Liverdis, bishop of Tréguier, instructed his parish priests to make them available to parishioners. Charles Démia and Noël Chomel took charge of distributing it in Lyon.

In 1675, Calloet-Kerbrat published the Mémoires de feu M. de Morangis (Memoirs of the late M. de Morangis), which proposed the establishment of general hospitals throughout the kingdom, based on the model of the Charité de Lyon, and proposed that the king set up a general directorate to carry out this mission. Paul Pellisson, Father Chaurand and Calloet-Kerbrat himself, intervened at court to obtain its creation.

In May 1679, the general agents of the clergy wrote a circular letter to parish priests in support of Callot-Kerbrat, Chaurand and Guevarre. Several bishops encouraged him: Balthasar Grangier de Liverdis, in the diocese of Tréguier, Jean-Jacques Séguier de La Verrière, in Nîmes and even Camille de Neufville de Villeroy in Lyon, under pressure from the Company of the Blessed Sacrament. Calloet-Kerbrat had written to Charles Démia, suggesting he enlist the support of Bédien Morange, vicar general of the diocese and himself a member of the society. This letter, published by Yves Poutet, revealed the close collaboration between Calloët and the founder of Lyon's elementary school, as well as the Breton gentleman's networks: he enjoyed the support of Bossuet, then bishop of Condom and tutor to the Dauphin, Cardinal de Bouillon, Claude Manis, canon of Saint-Paul de Lyon, and Pellisson.

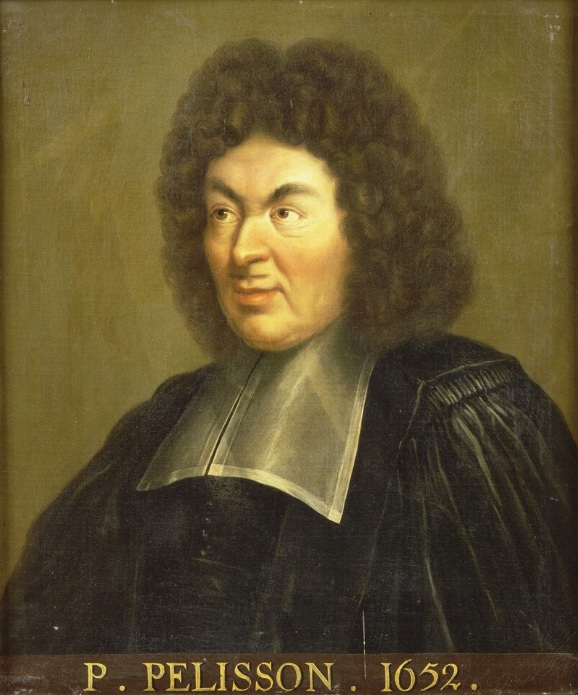
Academician Paul Pellisson, a close friend of Gabriel Calloet-Kerbrat.

Calloet-Kerbrat received support from academician Paul Pellisson, a Protestant who had converted to Catholicism in 1670 and was administrator of the caisse des conversions (conversion fund). The closeness between the two men was confirmed by shared concerns: Pelisson published a Remède universel pour les pauvres gens et leurs bestiaux (Universal Remedy for the Poor and their Livestock); for his part, Calloet-Kerbrat was passionate about supporting new converts, as evidenced by his correspondence with Nicolas de La Mare, commissaire au Châtelet de Paris, reporting cases of former Protestants persecuted by their co-religionists. He was particularly concerned by the case of a young girl from Lyon who had fled her family because her father, now a Protestant, had beaten her into marrying a Reformed man. After taking refuge at Port-Royal-des-Champs, she went mad and wandered naked through the streets of Paris, singing religious hymns.

In his advis de l'advocat général des pauvres (1683) (Advisor to the Advocate General of the Poor), Calloet-Kerbrat wrote that, in the kingdom of France, millions of needy poor "lead an abominable life, which damns them and those who could remedy it and do not", and considered that their conversion should take precedence over that of "Indians and savages". This concept, which linked the fight against pauperism to the salvation of the soul, was one of the conceptual foundations of the Company of the Blessed Sacrament.

Calloet-Kerbrat signed his pamphlets with the title "avocat général des pauvres" ("general advocate for the poor"), which could be likened to one of the attributes of Saint Yves, with whom he identified throughout his career, (Note: pp. 245–247) or "procureur et protecteur général des affaires concernant les pauvres dans toute la France" ("prosecutor and general protector of matters concerning the poor throughout France"). However, it's not clear whether this title should be taken to mean an official position. Calloet-Kerbrat acted within the framework of the company's networks, in a private capacity. In fact, he devoted most of his wealth to this activity, which he complained bitterly about to his friend Démia: "I am responsible for a wife and seven children, and yet for the past 25 years, I have been single-handedly paying for all the prints for the establishment of general hospitals, etc., and the postage of letters, which are immense. They come to me from the four corners of the kingdom and beyond. To provide them, I have cut my expenses. I deprive myself of all the conveniences and part of the necessities. We'll be rewarded with heavenly coin". It's true that the cost of franking letters, which was quite high, was then borne by the addressee.

In 1688, Calloet-Kerbrat was expelled from Paris by order of Louis XIV, for printing "several ridiculous memoirs on the state of the kingdom's poor, and holding public assemblies where he exaggerated this poverty". Intervention on his behalf by Gabriel Nicolas de la Reynie, Lieutenant General of the Paris police force, failed to save him. (Note: p. 253) The date and place of his death are unknown.

== Bibliography ==
- de Kerdrel, Vincent Audren, Gabriel Calloët de Kerbrat, agronome breton du dix-septième siècle [Gabriel Calloët de Kerbrat, seventeenth-century Breton agronomist] (in French), Saint-Brieuc, L. Prud'homme, 1885, extr. from Bulletin de l'Association bretonne, 1885.
- Bourde, André Jean, Agronomie et agronomes en France au 18th century [Agronomy and agronomists in 18th century France] (in French), Paris, S.E.V.P.E.N, coll. «Les Hommes et la terre», 1967.
- Jean-Pierre Gutton, La société et les pauvres. L’exemple de la généralité de Lyon [Society and the poor. The example of the Generalitat of Lyon] (in French), 1534–1789, Paris, Les Belles Lettres, 1971.
- Dessaux, Nicolas, Penser l'amélioration animale au 17th century : les brochures de Gabriel Calloet-Kerbrat [Thinking about animal improvement in the 17th century: Gabriel Calloet-Kerbrat's brochures] (in French), Anthropozoologica n° 39 (1), 2004.
- Bruzulier, Jean-Luc, Saint Yves, modèle pour les dévots bretons du xviie siècle ? L'exemple de Gabriel Calloët Kerbrat, avocat général des pauvres [Saint Yves, a model for Breton devotees in the 17th century? The example of Gabriel Calloët Kerbrat, Advocate General for the Poor], in Saint Yves et les Bretons. Culte, images, mémoire (1303–2003) [Saint Yves and the Bretons. Cult, images, memory (1303–2003)] (in French), Rennes / Brest, Presses universitaires de Rennes / Centre de recherche bretonne et celtique, 2004, pp. 241–253.
- Gutton, Jean-Pierre, Dévots et société au 17th century. Construire le Ciel sur la Terre [Devotions and society in the 17th century. Building Heaven on Earth] (in French), Belin, 2004.
