= Maraîchine =

French cattle breed

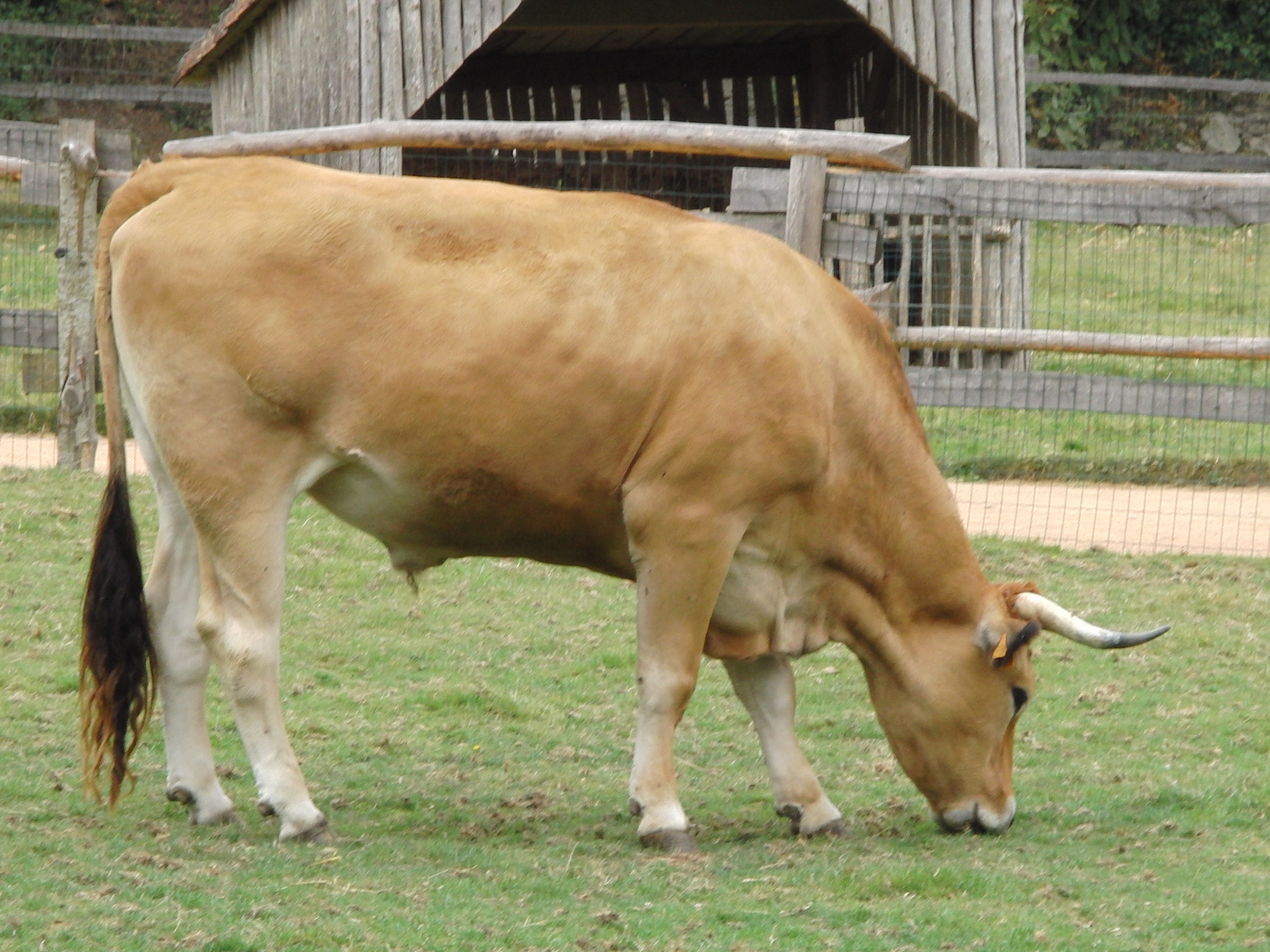
- Conservation status: FAO (2007): endangered; DAD-IS (2024): at risk/endangered
- Other names: Marchaise; Saintongeaise
- Country of origin: France
- Distribution: Loire and Gironde estuaries; Breton marshes; Olonne Marshes; Marais Poitevin; Saintongeais
- Standard: Association pour la Valorisation de la Race Bovine Maraîchine et des Prairies Humides
- Use: beef

Traits
- Weight: Male: 1200 kg; Female: 700 kg
- Height: Male: 145 cm; Female: 140 cm
- Skin colour: black
- Coat: wheaten
- Horn status: lyre-shaped horns in both sexes
- Cattle; Bos (primigenius) taurus

The Maraîchine (French pronunciation: [maʁɛʃin]) is a French breed of beef cattle. It originates in, and is named for, the Marais Poitevin, the marshlands on the Atlantic coast of the département of the Vendée in western France.

The coat ranges from light to grayish wheat, with black mucosa. It closely resembles the Nantaise and Parthenaise, two breeds also descended from the cattle that have populated western France for centuries.

The Maraîchine is renowned for its milk production and adaptation to wetlands. After WWII, it almost became extinct due to the specialization of breeds. However, the breed was saved in the 1980s through a group of friends and L'Institut de l'élevage, who reconstituted it from various animals scattered in the animal husbandry. And today, as a result of the breed's conservation program, numbers are on the rise.

== History ==
The Maraîchine forms a part of the large population – sometimes called Poitevine or Vendéenne – of wheaten-coloured cattle which traditionally occupied the western part of France, from the foothills of the Massif Central in the east to the eastern Morbihan in the west. It is closely related to the Parthenaise, the Nantaise and the extinct Marchoise and Berrichonne, all of which belong to the same group. Oxen of this type were used mainly for agricultural draught work in Haut-Poitou, in the Saintonge, in Touraine and in the Vendée. The cattle were sometimes called Gâtinaises or Boeufs de Gâtine, so named for the Gâtine Vendéenne. At the end of their working lives, these oxen were often sent to the area of Cholet to be fattened for slaughter, and then were known as 'Choletaises'.

The Maraîchine originates in the Marais Poitevin and other marshlands that lie between the estuaries of the Loire and the Gironde. It may have received some influence from Dutch cattle brought to the area in the early seventeenth century by workers from the Low Countries brought to the area by Humphrey Bradley, the English land drainage engineer who was maître des digues du royaume or 'master of dykes of the Kingdom' and had contracted to drain parts of the Marais de Saintonge.

In the second half of the nineteenth century, many vineyards in western France were destroyed by phylloxera and uprooted; the land was turned to pasture. A number of dairy co-operatives were formed, and milk from the Maraîchine and the Parthenaise was used to produce a local type of butter, the Beurre Charentes-Poitou, which quickly became well known.

In the early twentieth century, breeders of the Maraîchine made extensive use of Parthenaise bulls, in the hope of increasing growth rates and achieving lighter bone structure while still maintaining dairy qualities.

In 1971 the decision was taken to breed the Parthenaise for beef production only. In 2000 it was agreed that the criterion for distinguishing the modern Parthenaise from the more traditional Maraîchine would be the bulls used for reproduction: offspring of bulls born later than Joli-Coeur (born in 1974) would be considered Parthenaises, while offspring of older bulls, of which stocks of semen were still held, could be considered Maraîchines. A genetic study in 2004 found Joli-Coeur and all approved Parthenais bulls born after him to be homozygous for the mh double-muscling gene, while bulls used in Maraîchine breeding were heterozygous or homozygous recessive. The Maraîchine thus represents a traditional form of the Parthenaise.

=== A renewed interest in the breed ===
In 1986, three friends decided to reconstitute a herd of Maraîchine cows. They received support from the Livestock Institute, which listed the existing Maraîchine cows.

In 1987, when a farmer with a herd of Parthenaise-Maraîchine cows with good milk production decided to sell his livestock, the Ecomuseum of Daviaud bought the two best cows, while the trio of friends bought the rest of the herd.

In 1988, the Association pour la valorisation de la race bovine maraîchine et des prairies humides (“Association for the valorisation of the Maraichine breed and wet meadows” in English) was founded, and with the support of the General Council of Vendée, purchased the first four bulls of the breed. Between 1989 and 1991, the association bought around 50 cows. From this base, many females were placed on various farms in the region. This led to the creation of a conservatory in Nalliers, where animals were entrusted to the Luçon-Pétré Agricultural College and subsequently to private individuals. In 1986, there were only thirty animals, but by 2004 the number had risen to 1,500, including 534 cows and 60 breeding bulls.

== Morphology ==
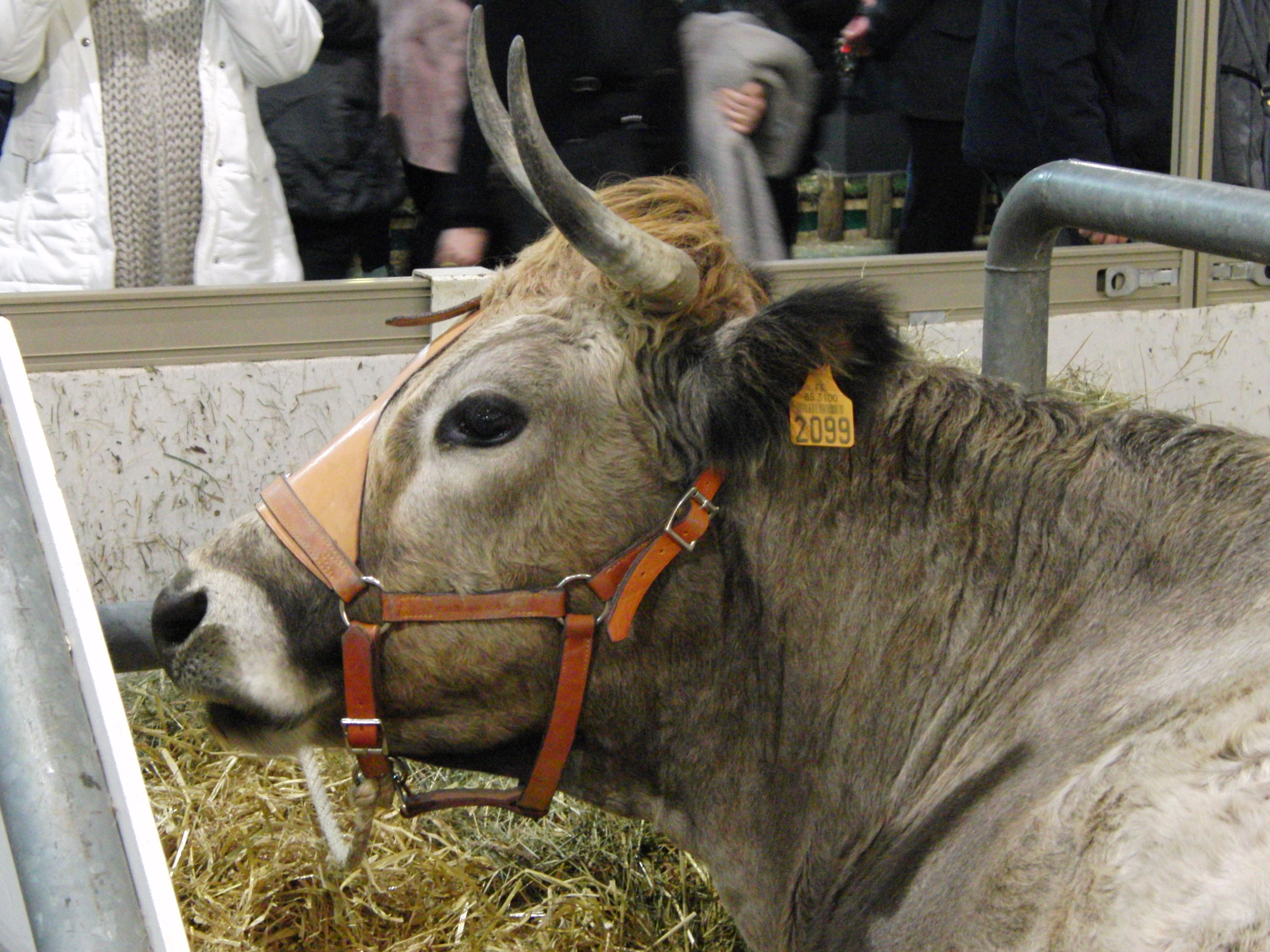
Head of a Maraichine cow in the Agriculture Hall.

This breed is very large: the cow measures 140 cm for 700 kg and the bull 145 cm for 1,200 kg.

Culards, unlike the Parthenaise breed, are not accepted by the Maraîchine standards.

It differs from its Nantaise cousin by its slightly redder coat, the black color of the mucous membranes, the edges of the ears, the shape of its head, and its less straight horns.

== Abilities ==
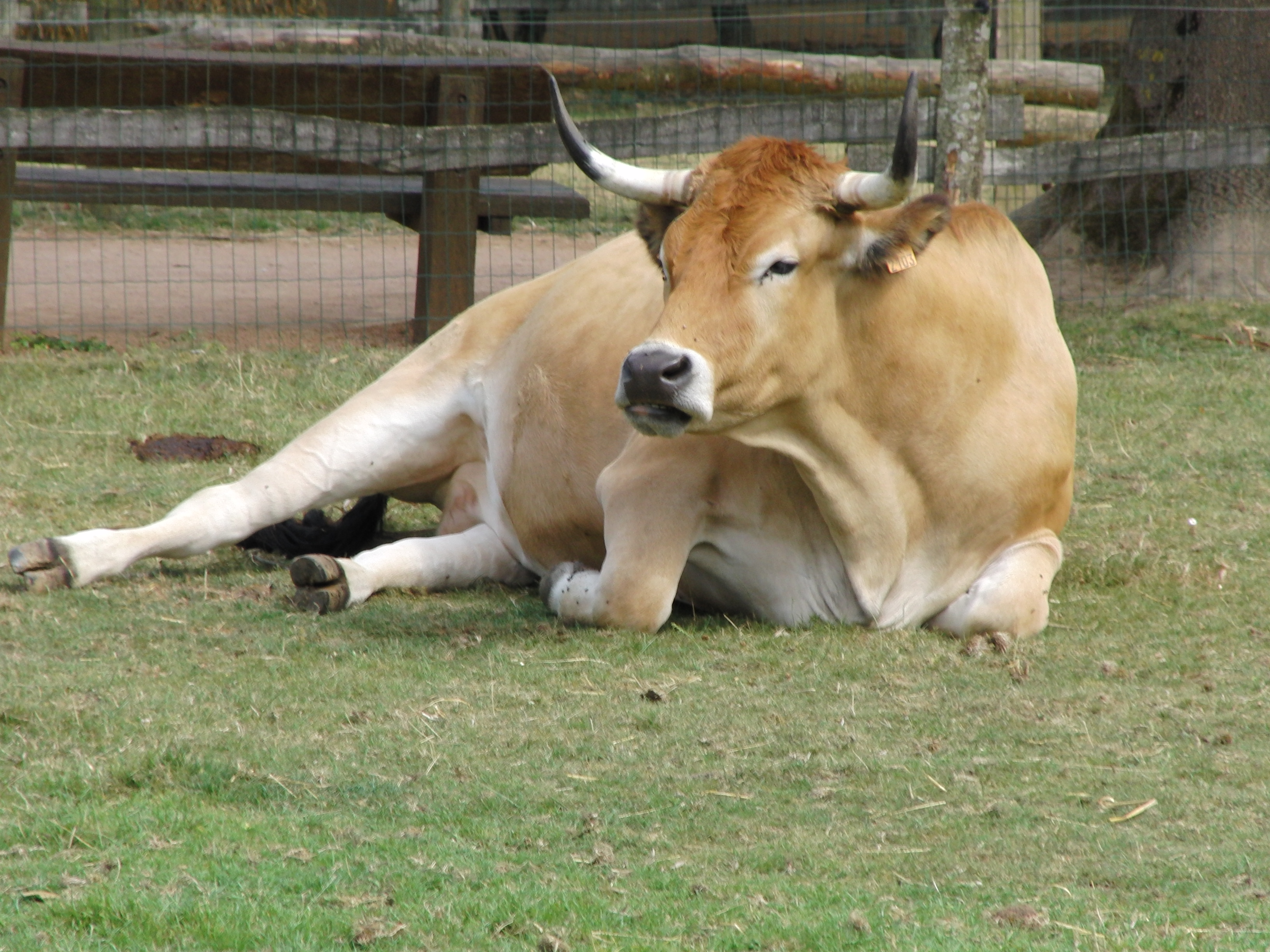
Maraîchine cow lying down

The Maraîchine is a mixed and hardy breed, in particular to diseases and parasites. Also, it has a long lifespan with a high fertility rate. In addition, it thrives in wet meadows (with their characteristic vegetation), the environment in which it has historically been bred, and it can withstand the fluctuations between drought and high humidity that occur in sub-humid marshes.

In the past, it produced 5,000 kg of milk per lactation for local consumption, and this delicious milk contributed to the reputation of Charente-Poitou butter. It was also used as a working animal.

Today, their milk is used almost exclusively for calf rearing, and there was only one dairy farm in 2004. Maraîchine produces good-quality meat, mainly from three-year-old steers and suckling calves.

== Selection and conservation program ==
Maraîchine has always been bred in the marshes of western France. Its breeders selected their animals so that they were best adapted to the marshy environment and wet meadows. This long selection process has given the breed its distinctive character.

In 1988, with the support of the Marais Poitevin Regional Nature Park (renamed Regional Nature Park in 2014), the breed was recognized and a herdbook was created. When efforts to save the breed began, the Association for the valorisation of the Maraichine breed and wet meadows bought the cows and then returned them to the farms, remaining co-owners.

Although this is no longer the case for the females, the system has persisted for the males. After being selected by a technical conservation group (in which the association, Livestock Institute, and INRA participate), they are purchased by the association and placed in a breeding station belonging to a member breeder. They are then returned to the breeder's farm as needed.

While it was easy to find old Maraîchine cows on farms, it was otherwise difficult to find male breeding stock. The current herd is almost entirely descended from four crossbred Parthenaise bulls born in the 1960s (their semen having been found) and from one living crossbreed Parthenaise bull. The semen of a son of this latter bull is collected in the artificial insemination center of Saint-Symphorien, at the request of the Livestock Institute.

Today, the semen of 28 bulls is stored and available for artificial insemination. The inbreeding rate among females is only 1.8%, which is very low for a breed with a small population.
