= Hôtel de Ville, Lannion =

Town hall in Lannion, France

Hôtel de Ville
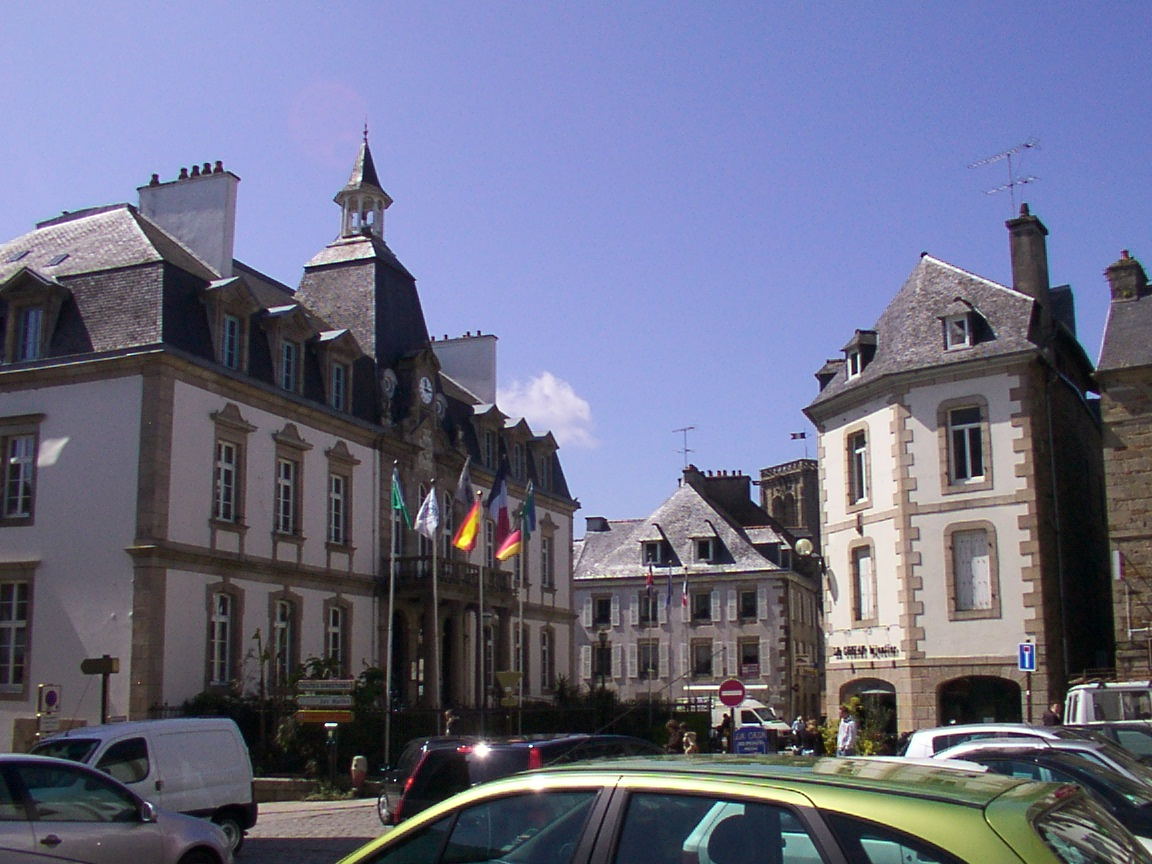
- The main frontage of the Hôtel de Ville in October 2006

General information
- Type: City hall
- Architectural style: Second Empire style
- Location: Lannion, France
- Coordinates: 48.7321°N 3.4593°W
- Completed: 1886

The Hôtel de Ville (French pronunciation: [otɛl də vil], City Hall) is a municipal building in Lannion, Côtes-d'Armor, in northwestern France, standing on Place du Général Leclerc.

== History ==
The first municipal building in Lannion was a courthouse on Place du Centre (now Place du Général Leclerc). It served as the venue for hearings by the judges of Trégor as well as the venue for meetings of the local burghers. It was designed in the Baroque style, built in ashlar stone and was completed in 1615. The design involved a symmetrical main frontage of three bays facing onto the square. The central bay featured a double-forestair leading up to porch formed by a pair of Doric order columns supporting an entablature. On the first floor, there was a French door with a balustraded balcony. The outer bays were fenestrated by casement windows on both floors. At roof level, there was a semi-circular pediment which was surmounted by a clock. In 1855, after the old courthouse became dilapidated, the judicial authorities established a new courthouse on what is now Allée du Palais de Justice on the east bank of the River Léguer.

In the early 1880s, the council led by the mayor, Émile Le Taillander, decided to commission a dedicated town hall. The site they selected had been occupied by an old prison. The new building was designed in the Second Empire style, built in ashlar stone and was completed in 1886. The design involved a symmetrical main frontage of nine bays facing onto the street. The central section of three bays featured a short flight of steps leading up to a tetrastyle porch formed by four Doric order columns supporting an entablature. There were three round-headed French doors and a balustraded balcony on the first floor and a pediment containing a coat of arms above the central bay. The pediment was surmounted by a clock and, behind that, there was a steep roof with a octagonal belfry. The wings were fenestrated by segmental-headed windows with keystones on the ground floor and by square-headed windows with cornices on the first floor. Internally, the principal room was the Salle du Conseil (council chamber).

Following the liberation of the town by the French Forces of the Interior on 4 August 1944, a group of soldiers led by Corentin André, better known by his wartime pseudonym "Captain Maurice ", paraded past the mayor and other officials standing on the balcony of the town hall.
