= Lannion =

Lannion Lannuon (Breton)
- Subprefecture and commune
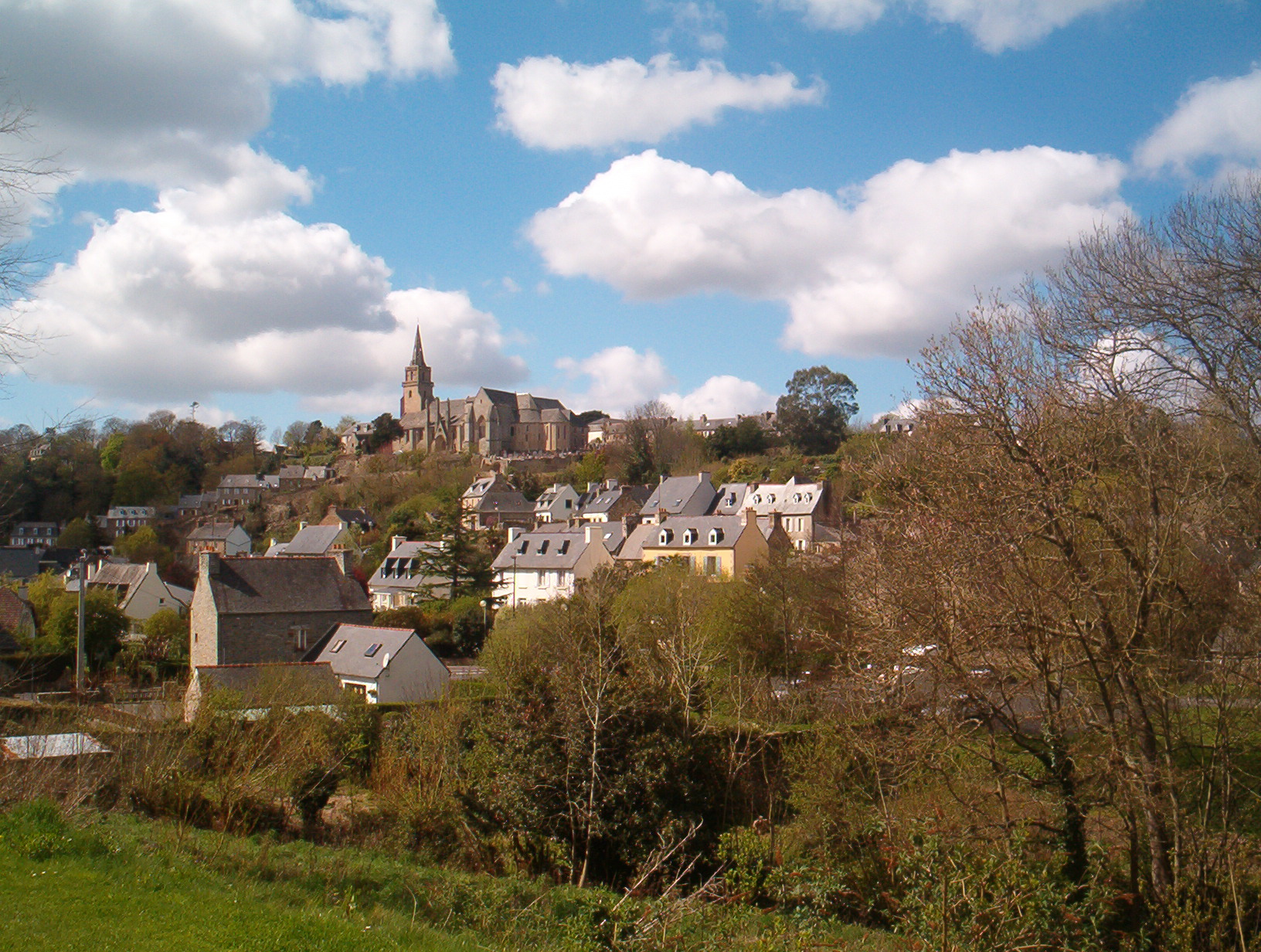
- A general view of Lannion

- Flag Coat of arms
- Location of Lannion
- Location within France Location within Brittany
- Coordinates: 48°44′00″N 3°27′15″W
- Country: France
- Region: Brittany
- Department: Côtes-d'Armor
- Arrondissement: Lannion
- Canton: Lannion
- Intercommunality: Lannion-Trégor Communauté

Government
  - Mayor (2020–2026): Paul Le Bihan
- Area^{1}: 43.91 km^{2} (16.95 sq mi)
- Highest elevation: 107 m (351 ft)
- Lowest elevation: 0 m (0 ft)
- Population (2023): 20,315
  - Density: 462.7/km^{2} (1,198/sq mi)
- Time zone: UTC+01:00 (CET)
  - Summer (DST): UTC+02:00 (CEST)
- INSEE/Postal code: 22113 /22300
- ^{1} French Land Register data, which excludes lakes, ponds, glaciers > 1 km^{2} (0.386 sq mi or 247 acres) and river estuaries.

Lannion (French pronunciation: [lanjɔ̃] ; Breton: Lannuon) is a commune in the Côtes-d'Armor department in Brittany in northwestern France. It is a subprefecture of Côtes-d'Armor, the capital of Trégor and the center of an urban area of almost 60,000 inhabitants.

== Climate ==
Lannion has an oceanic climate (Köppen climate classification Cfb). The average annual temperature in Lannion is 11.5 °C (52.7 °F). The average annual rainfall is 945.0 mm (37.20 in) with December as the wettest month. The temperatures are highest on average in August, at around 17.1 °C (62.8 °F), and lowest in January, at around 6.7 °C (44.1 °F). The highest temperature ever recorded in Lannion was 40.0 °C (104.0 °F) on 18 July 2022; the coldest temperature ever recorded was −7.1 °C (19.2 °F) on 28 February 2018.

Climate data for Lannion (1981–2010 normals, extremes 1993–present)
Month	Jan	Feb	Mar	Apr	May	Jun	Jul	Aug	Sep	Oct	Nov	Dec	Year
Record high °C (°F)	17.1 (62.8)	22.4 (72.3)	24.1 (75.4)	27.6 (81.7)	29.3 (84.7)	32.8 (91.0)	40.0 (104.0)	35.3 (95.5)	31.5 (88.7)	29.9 (85.8)	21.0 (69.8)	17.9 (64.2)	40.0 (104.0)
Mean daily maximum °C (°F)	9.3 (48.7)	9.9 (49.8)	11.6 (52.9)	13.2 (55.8)	16.1 (61.0)	18.8 (65.8)	20.5 (68.9)	20.9 (69.6)	19.2 (66.6)	16.2 (61.2)	12.2 (54.0)	9.6 (49.3)	14.8 (58.6)
Daily mean °C (°F)	6.7 (44.1)	7.1 (44.8)	8.3 (46.9)	9.6 (49.3)	12.5 (54.5)	15.0 (59.0)	16.8 (62.2)	17.1 (62.8)	15.4 (59.7)	12.9 (55.2)	9.4 (48.9)	7.0 (44.6)	11.5 (52.7)
Mean daily minimum °C (°F)	4.2 (39.6)	4.3 (39.7)	5.0 (41.0)	5.9 (42.6)	8.8 (47.8)	11.3 (52.3)	13.1 (55.6)	13.4 (56.1)	11.5 (52.7)	9.7 (49.5)	6.6 (43.9)	4.5 (40.1)	8.2 (46.8)
Record low °C (°F)	−6.3 (20.7)	−7.1 (19.2)	−4.0 (24.8)	−2.2 (28.0)	−0.6 (30.9)	3.9 (39.0)	6.0 (42.8)	5.8 (42.4)	3.3 (37.9)	−3.1 (26.4)	−4.8 (23.4)	−4.5 (23.9)	−7.1 (19.2)
Average precipitation mm (inches)	94.6 (3.72)	90.6 (3.57)	68.3 (2.69)	78.2 (3.08)	70.6 (2.78)	51.2 (2.02)	62.1 (2.44)	52.6 (2.07)	53.0 (2.09)	98.5 (3.88)	106.4 (4.19)	118.9 (4.68)	945.0 (37.20)
Average precipitation days (≥ 1 mm)	15.4	14.0	12.2	12.4	11.5	7.9	10.3	9.2	9.1	14.0	16.1	16.8	148.8
Source: Meteociel

== Population ==
Inhabitants of Lannion are called lannionnais in French.

Historical population

Year	Pop.	±% p.a.
1793	3,706	—
1800	3,132	−2.38%
1806	3,426	+1.51%
1821	3,597	+0.33%
1831	5,371	+4.09%
1836	5,461	+0.33%
1841	5,650	+0.68%
1846	5,849	+0.69%
1851	6,075	+0.76%
1856	6,642	+1.80%
1861	6,598	−0.13%
1866	6,882	+0.85%
1872	6,223	−1.66%
1876	6,294	+0.28%
1881	5,998	−0.96%
1886	6,205	+0.68%
1891	6,002	−0.66%
1896	6,126	+0.41%
1901	6,010	−0.38%

Year	Pop.	±% p.a.
1906	5,856	−0.52%
1911	6,174	+1.06%
1921	6,047	−0.21%
1926	6,274	+0.74%
1931	6,430	+0.49%
1936	6,584	+0.47%
1946	7,220	+0.93%
1954	6,734	−0.87%
1962	9,479	+4.37%
1968	12,535	+4.77%
1975	16,867	+4.33%
1982	16,641	−0.19%
1990	16,958	+0.24%
1999	18,368	+0.89%
2007	19,773	+0.93%
2012	19,380	−0.40%
2017	19,880	+0.51%
2023	20,315	+0.36%

Source: EHESS and INSEE (1968-2023)

== History ==
The Hôtel de Ville

Lannion takes its name from "Lann Huon" in Breton or "Parish of Huon" in English.

The old neighborhood of Lannion attracts many tourists to the city. The old neighborhood contains old squares, a church called Brélévenez, half-timbered houses, chapels and frescoes.

The Hôtel de Ville was completed in 1886.

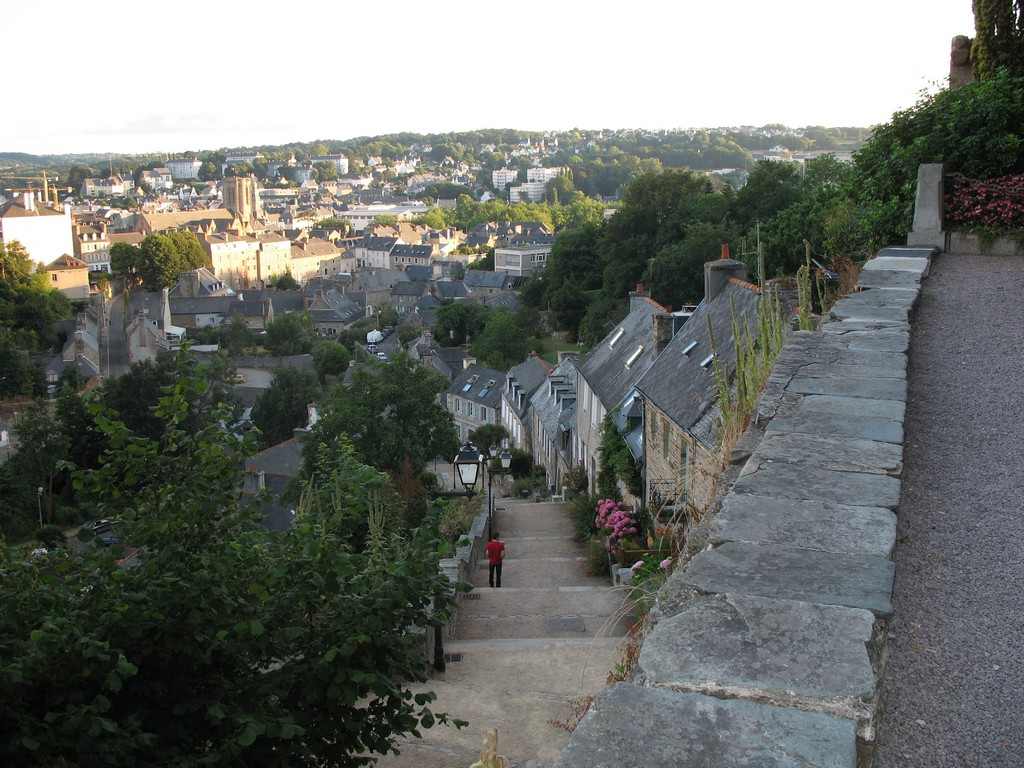
View from the church of Brélévénez

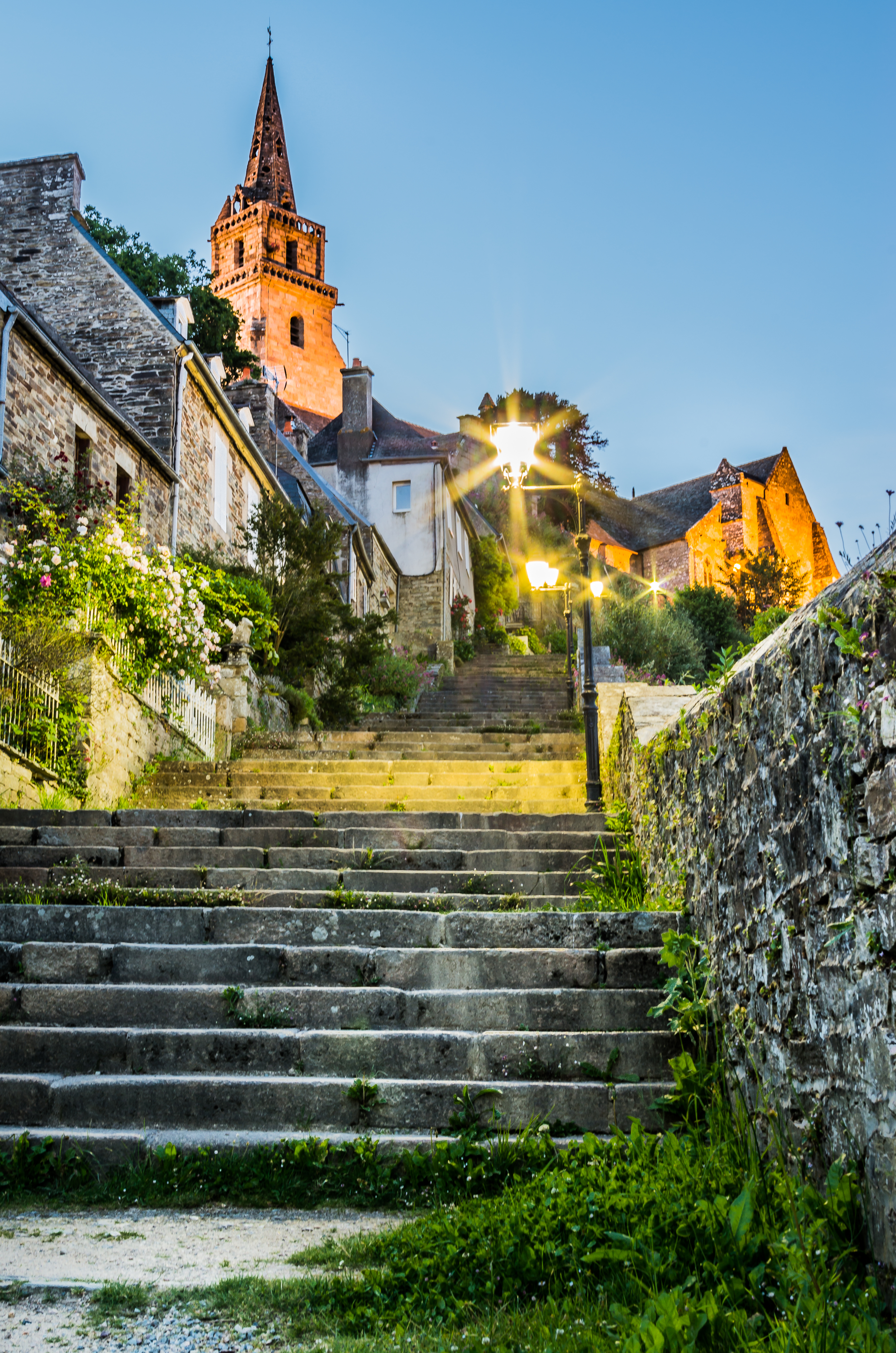
Church of Lannion Église de la Trinité de Brélévenez

== Breton language ==
On 23 October 2006, the municipality launched a plan to promote the Breton language through the Ya d'ar brezhoneg ("Yes to Breton") charter.

In 2023, 18.7% of the children attended bilingual schools in primary education.

== Economy ==
Lannion is a large telecommunications research center in France with several firms such as Nokia, Orange and SAGEMCOM operating there. The presence of a large telecommunications industry in the area has led to two institutes of technology in the area, IUT Lannion and a college of engineering, ENSSAT.

== Culture ==
Regular concerts known as "Les Tardives" are held in the town square during the summer months. Lannion is also home to the "Carré Magique", a well known theatre company in the area.

== Transport ==
Lannion is served by extensive transport links. The nearby Lannion – Côte de Granit Airport can accommodate larger flights arriving from Paris and other French destinations. It is a one-hour flight from Lannion to Paris. Lannion station provides TGV services to Brest, St. Brieuc, Rennes and Paris as well as TER links to local stations.

There is a bus service connecting the town centre to surrounding areas, TILT (Transports Intercommunaux de Lannion-Trégor), with six lines.

Line A
Hospital/Airport via Quai d'Aiguillon (in the centre of the town)
Line B
Kerbabu/Coppens via Quai d'Aiguillon
Line C
Alcatel/Kérilis
Line Navéo
small bus around the centre of the town
Line F
market day line (Thursday morning).

== International relations ==
Lannion is twinned with:

- Günzburg, Germany
- (Galicia (Spain)) Viveiro, Galicia (Spain)
- Caerphilly, Wales

== Notable people ==
The following were born in Lannion:

- François-Jean-Marie Laouënan (1868), Archbishop
- Pierre-Yves André (1974), footballer
- Jean-Efflam Bavouzet (1962), pianist
- Charles Le Goffic (1863), novelist and historian
- Johan Le Bon (1990), cyclist
- Christophe Le Mével (1980), cyclist
- Denis-Will Poha (1997), footballer
- Pierre Sabbagh (1918), television personality
- Gabriel Calloet-Kerbrat (born between 1616 and 1620), agriculturist and writer.

== See also ==
- Communes of the Côtes-d'Armor department
