= Parthenaise =

French breed of cattle

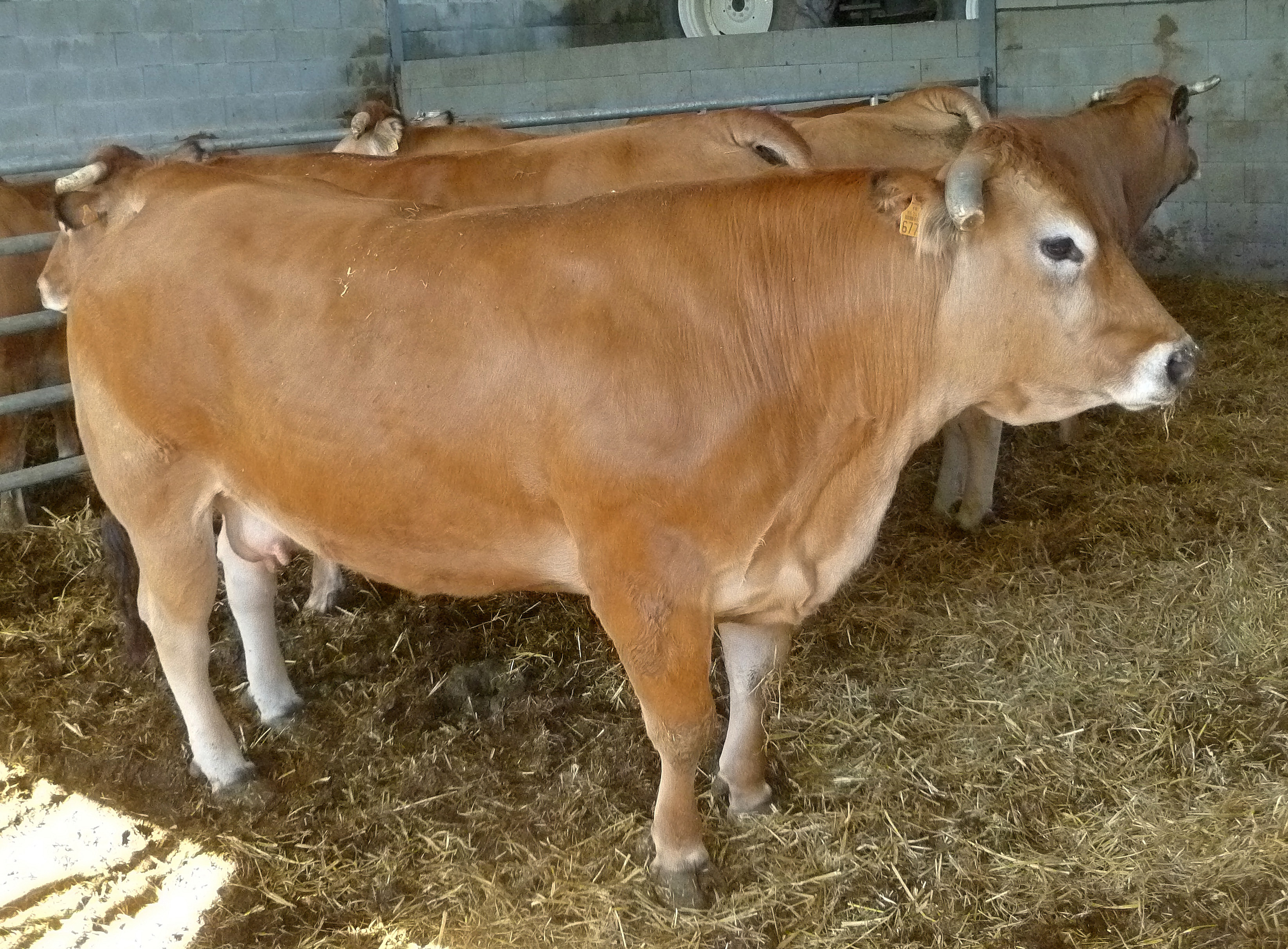
- Conservation status: FAO (2007): not at risk
- Country of origin: France
- Standard: Organisme de Sélection de la race Parthenaise
- Use: formerly triple-purpose: draught, meat and milk; now: meat

Traits
- Weight: Male: 1100 kg; Female: 800 kg
- Height: Male: 155 cm; Female: 145 cm
- Skin colour: black
- Coat: wheaten
- Horn status: horned in both sexes
- Cattle; Bos (primigenius) taurus

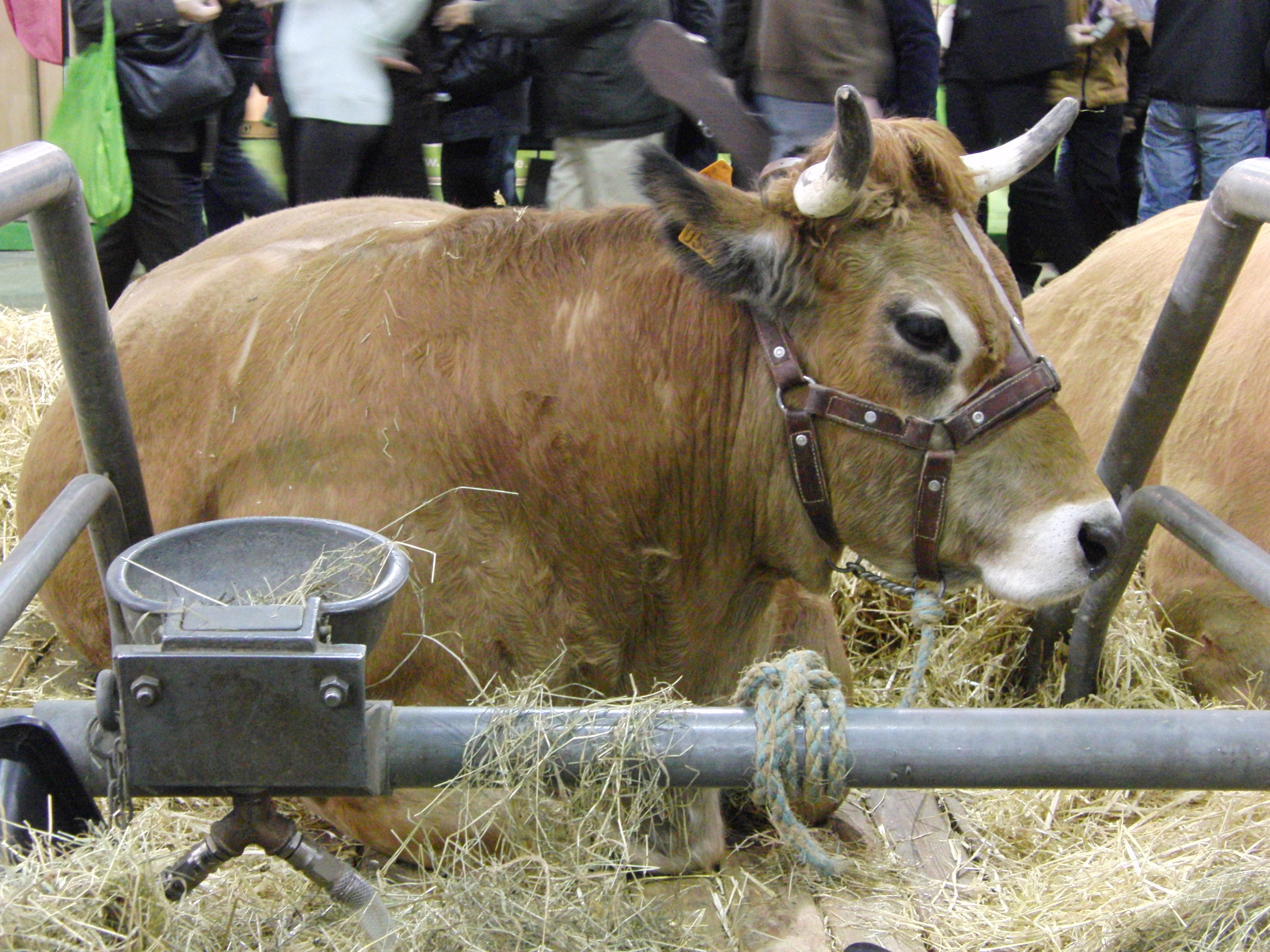
Cow at the Salon international de l'agriculture in Paris in 2014

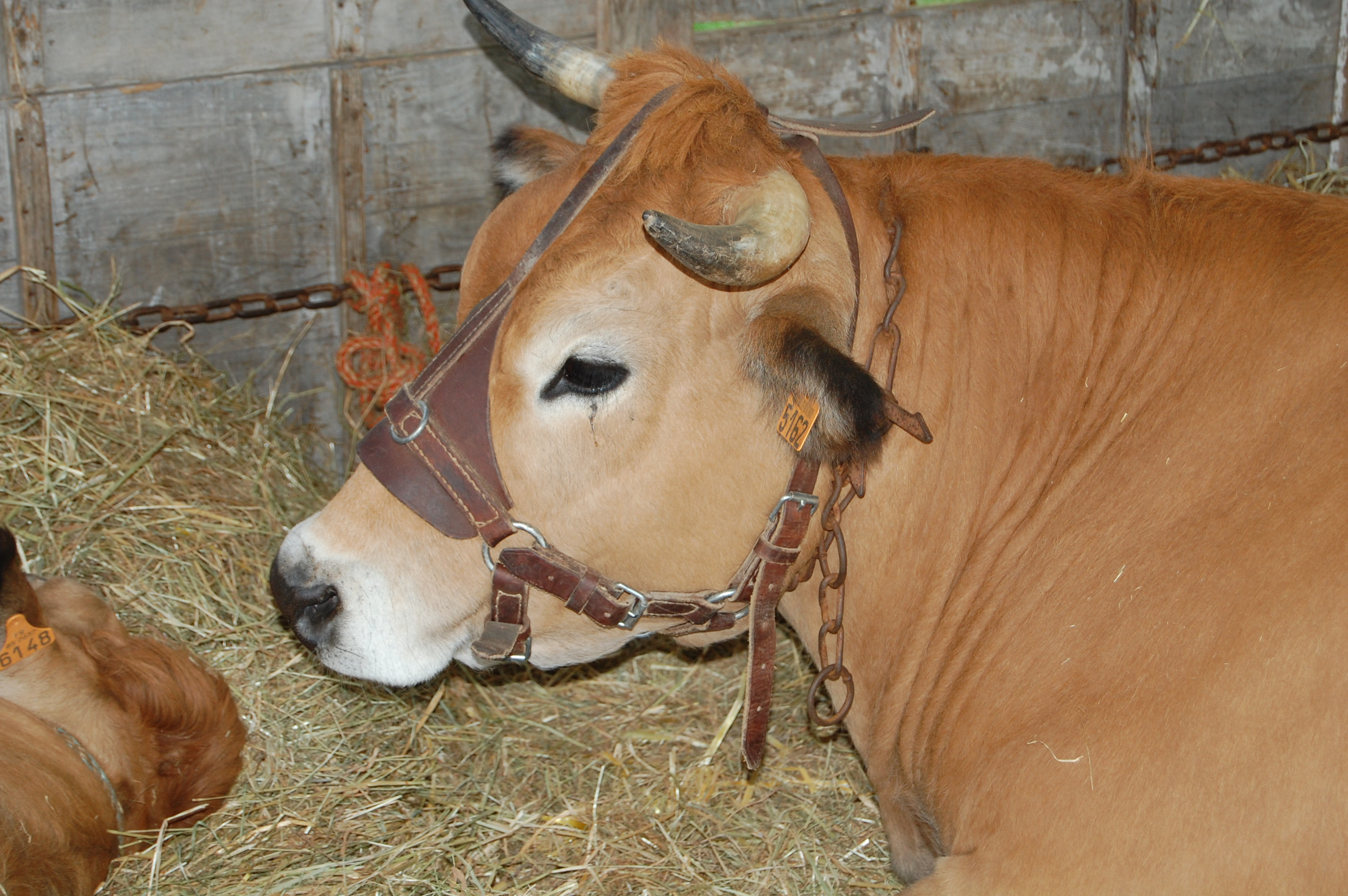
Head of a cow, showing the white round the eyes and muzzle

The Parthenaise is a French breed of beef cattle. It is named for the town of Parthenay in the département of Deux-Sèvres, in the Nouvelle-Aquitaine region of western France. It was formerly a triple-purpose breed, raised for milk, meat and draught work, but is now raised mainly for beef.

== History ==
The Parthenaise forms a part of the large population – sometimes called Poitevine or Vendéenne – of wheaten-coloured cattle which traditionally occupied the western part of France, from the Loire to the Gironde. It is closely related to the Maraîchine, the Nantaise and the extinct Marchoise and Berrichonne, all of which belong to the same group. Oxen of this type were used mainly for agricultural draught work in Haut-Poitou, in the Saintonge, in Touraine and in the Vendée. The cattle were sometimes called Gâtinaises or Boeufs de Gâtine, so named for the Gâtine Vendéenne. At the end of their working lives, these oxen were often sent to the area of Cholet to be fattened for slaughter, and then were known as 'Choletaises'.

The name of the breed is due to Eugène Gayot, who in 1860 identified Parthenay, in the département of Deux-Sèvres, as the principal centre of production. In the second half of the nineteenth century many vineyards were destroyed by phylloxera and uprooted; the land was turned to pasture. A number of dairy co-operatives were formed, and the Parthenaise was used to produce a local type of butter, the Beurre Charentes-Poitou, which quickly became well known. By the late nineteenth century the stock numbered some 1.1 million head.

A herd-book was established in 1893 or 1894. From that time the population began to decline. This was partly because of the mechanisation of agriculture, which reduced the need for draught cattle, and partly because of competition from specialised breeds which began to reach the area from other parts of France: the Maine-Anjou and later the Charolaise for beef, and the Normande and later the Friesian for milk. After the Second World War the Parthenaise was still well represented in the Vendée and the Gâtine, but was under threat, both from the difficulty of finding bulls that met the stringent regulations for registration for artificial insemination, and from reduction of herds by culling to eradicate bovine tuberculosis. By the 1960s it had become clear that the dual-purpose aim for the breed was no longer viable, and in 1971 the decision was taken to select for beef production only. Since that time the population has grown consistently: the number of breeding cows rose from 7000 in 1990 to 33000 in 2008. In 2014 the total breed population was reported at 43187.

In 2000 it was decided that the criterion for distinguishing the modern Parthenaise from the more traditional Maraîchine – which also descends from the old Vendéenne grouping – would be the bulls used for reproduction: offspring of bulls born later than Joli-Coeur (born in 1974) would be considered Parthenaises, while offspring of older bulls, of which stocks of semen were still held, could be considered Maraîchines. A genetic study in 2004 found Joli-Coeur and all approved Parthenais bulls born after him to be homozygous for the mh double-muscling gene, while bulls used in Maraîchine breeding were heterozygous or homozygous recessive. The Maraîchine thus represents a traditional form of the Parthenaise.

Some cattle have been exported to Belgium, to Ireland, to the Netherlands and to the United Kingdom.

== Characteristics ==
The coat ranges in colour from light to dark wheaten, with grey rings round the muzzle and eyes. The skin is black, as are the mucosa, the hooves, the switch and the edges of the ears. The horns are lyre-shaped.

== Use ==
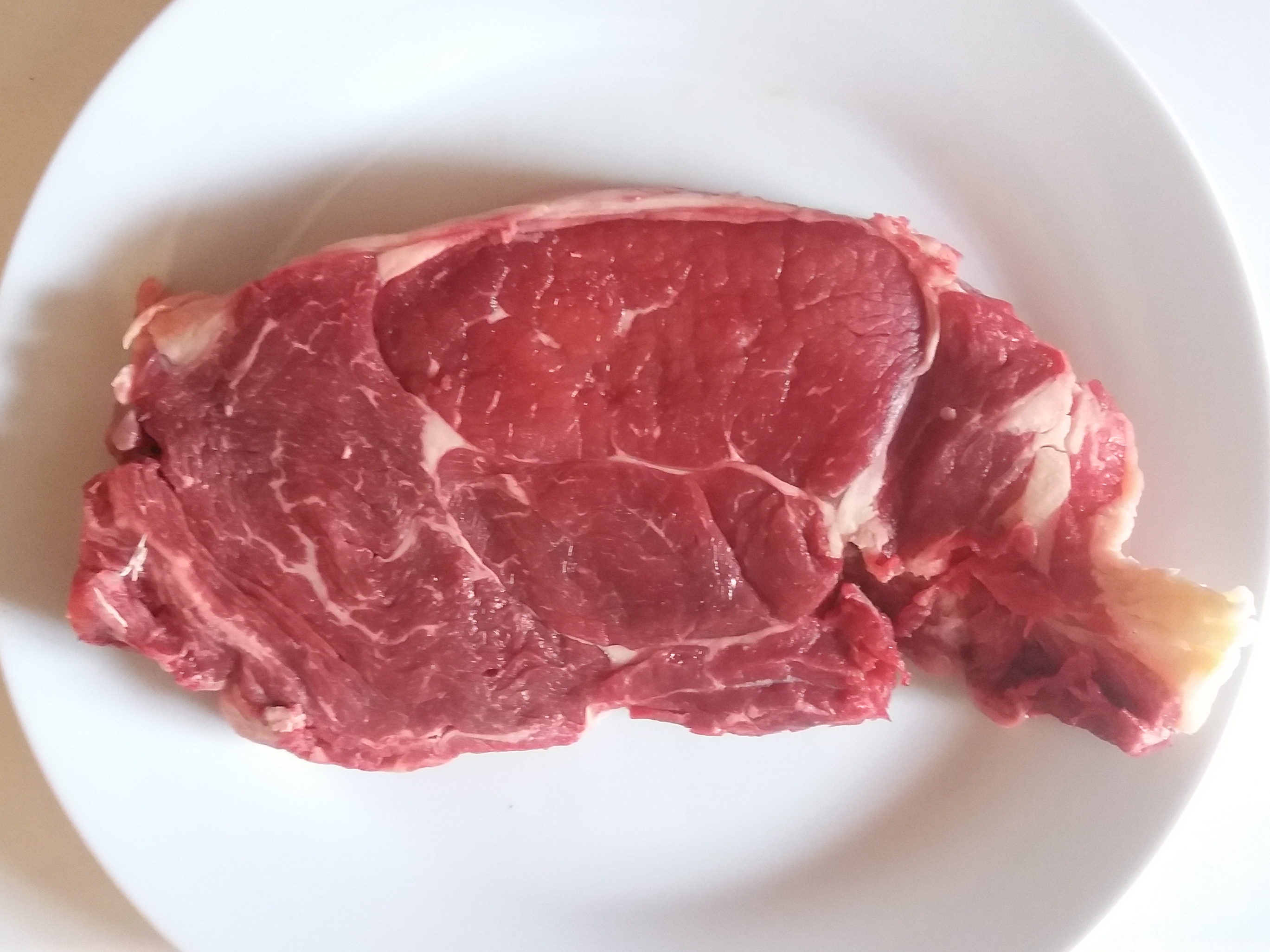
Parthenaise entrecôte

The Parthenise was traditionally a triple-purpose breed, reared for draught work, for milk and for meat. From 1971 selection was for beef only. Calves reach an average weight of 165 kg at 120 days, and average about 278 kg at 210 days.
