= Company of the Blessed Sacrament =

French Catholic secret society

The Company of the Blessed Sacrament (French: Compagnie du Saint-Sacrement), also sometimes referred to as the Company of the Most Blessed Sacrament, was a French Catholic secret society which included among its members many Catholic notables of the 17th century. It was responsible for much of the contribution of the Catholic Church in France to meeting the social needs of the day, including through support for various foreign missionary societies and the establishment of the General Hospital of Paris.

== Early years ==
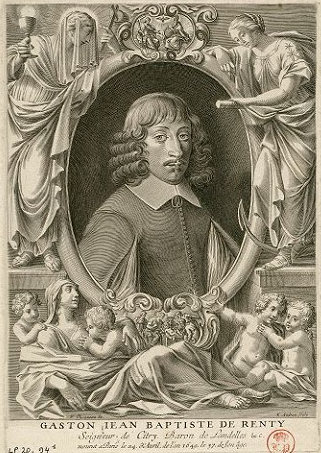
Gaston Jean Baptiste de Renty

The Company was founded in March 1630 at the Convent of the Capuchin friars on the rue du Faubourg Saint-Honoré by Henri de Levis, Duc de Ventadour, who had just escorted his wife to the Carmelite convent; Henri de Pichery, officer of Louis XIII's household; Jacques Adhemar de Monteil de Grignan, a future bishop; and Philippe d'Angoumois, a Capuchin. Among those who soon joined it were Jean Suffren, a Jesuit and the confessor to both Louis XIII and Marie de' Medici; the son and the grandson of Gaspard de Coligny, the Protestant admiral; and Charles de Condren, the second superior general of the French Oratory and founder of the College of Juilly.

In 1631, the company adopted its name. It was organized under the authority of a board composed of nine members, changed every three months, and which included a superior, usually a layman, and a spiritual director who was a priest. The associates met weekly and their organization was simultaneously a pious confraternity, a charitable society and a militant association for the defence of the Catholic Church. It was overseen by Gaston Jean Baptiste de Renty from 1639 until his death in 1649.

Members of the association included:

- Charles de Schomberg
- Guillaume de Lamoignon
- de Mesnes
- Le Fèvre d'Ormesson
- Alain de Solminihac
- Vincent de Paul
- Jean-Jacques Olier
- Jacques-Bénigne Bossuet
- John Eudes

== Organization ==
The company was a private association. Louis XIII covertly encouraged it but it never wished to have the letters patent that would have rendered it legal. The first archbishop of Paris, Gondi, refused his blessing to the company, even though Louis XIII wrote him a personal letter in 1631 requesting him to do so. The brief obtained from the pope in 1633 by the Count de Brassan, one of the members, was of no importance and the company, eager to secure a new one, was granted only a few indulgences which it would not accept, as it did not wish to be treated as a simple confraternity. Guido Bagni, papal nuncio from 1645 to 1656, often attended the sessions of the company but its existence was never regularly acknowledged by an official document from Rome.

The rule of secrecy obliged members not to speak of the Company to those who do not belong to it and never to make known the names of the individuals composing it. New members were elected by the board and it was soon decided that no congréganiste, i.e. member of a lay congregation directed by ecclesiastics, could be eligible. Matters of an especially delicate nature were not discussed at the weekly meetings, these being frequently attended by a hundred members, but were reserved for the investigation of the board. The company printed nothing and the keeping of written minutes was conducted with the utmost caution. There were fifty important branches outside of Paris, about thirty being unknown even to the bishops.

== Works ==
The association worked to correct abuses among the clergy and in monasteries and to procure missions for rural parishes. Moreover, it was interested in the care of the poor, the improvement of hospitals, and the administration of those condemned to galleys and prisons; and, that the poor might have legal advice, it created what today is known as the secrétariats du peuple (public legal services). It protected the fraternities of shoemakers and tailors organized by the Baron de Renty and assisted Vincent de Paul in most of his undertakings.

=== Anti-duelling ===
The Company established the Confraternity of the Passion of Christ, led by Marquis Antoine de Salignae-Fénelon to discourage duelling.

=== Foreign missions ===
In 1653, the Company provided financial assistance to aid the establishment of the Paris Foreign Missions Society. In order to assist missionaries traveling to Asia, in 1660 the Compagnie de Chine was founded, modeled on the Dutch East India Company. The Propaganda, the Portuguese, the Dutch, and the Jesuits objected that this was an attempt by France to become engaged in the Asian apostolate and trade. In 1664, the Compagnie de Chine was absorbed by Jean-Baptiste Colbert's Compagnie française pour le commerce des Indes orientales.

=== General Hospital of Paris ===
The devastation of the Fronde resulted in a particularly large influx of beggars into Paris. The growing population of beggars was approximately 40,000 people, many of whom were refugees impoverished during the wars. This amount would have constituted roughly 10% of the Parisian population. To alleviate such destitution, in 1652 the Company started relief efforts centered around the development of a charitable storehouse stocked with provisions, clothing, and agricultural implements to be distributed among the impoverished peasants. At that time the Company spent 380,000 livres in charity each year. However, after the wars' conclusion, the company decided to advocate for a policy of confinement, a more long-term solution to the city's poverty and mendicancy. The centralized approach to extreme poverty in France was based on the premise that medical care was a right for those without family or income, and formalized the admission process in hospitals to prevent overcrowding and unsanitary conditions. Christophe du Plessis-Montbard, a member of the Company of the Blessed Sacrament, began to work with the Parliament in 1653 on developing plans for a new Parisian general hospital. Also instrumental in shaping these plans were Les Dames de la Charité, an organization of wealthy lay women led at the time by Marie Madeleine d'Aiguillon. The General Hospital of Paris was ultimately established three years later in 1656 by a royal edict of Louis XIV. The hospital was endowed not just with authority on its own premises, but also with jurisdiction over all the poor residents of the city.

During the middle decades of the century, the Company of the Blessed Sacrament "...was the only organization with any political effectiveness in the country." Armand de Bourbon, Prince of Conti joined in the mid 1650s. On one occasion, by secret manoeuvring, the Company succeeded in preventing twenty-five otherwise eligible young Huguenots from being received as attorneys at the parlement of Paris. According to the Count d'Argenson and René Rapin, a Jesuit who opposed the Company, proceedings of the Company were the starting-point of the policy that was to culminate in 1685 in the revocation of the Edict of Nantes.

== Decline ==
The year 1660 witnessed the start of the decline of the Company. As the Company expanded its influence beyond Paris, it came to the attention of Cardinal Mazarin, who mistrusted it, as did a number of high church officials. It was denounced to Mazarin by François Harlay de Champvallon, Archbishop of Rouen. Mazarin sought to have the Company suppressed as an autonomous body overlapping provinces and social classes. Anne of Austria was opposed because many of the members were friends whom she considered above reproach and they did good works.

On December 13, 1660 the members held a last general meeting at which, amid expressions of regret and deep emotion, it was decided to suspend their Thursday sessions and to add "ten or twelve elders" to the members of the board so that the company might continue to act provisionally. Then these elders and the board selected eight individuals who were to correspond with the country branches, one of the eight being Bossuet. On the same date Parliament issued a decree prohibiting all illicit assemblies, confraternities, congregations, and communities, but Lamoignon, a member of the Company and its first president, succeeded in preventing it from being designated by name. Cardinal Mazarin died and any enforcement against the Company went into abeyance.

It seems that the meetings of the board and the elders were held regularly enough in 1664 to be instrumental in obtaining the banning of Moliere's comedy Tartuffe, but had ceased almost completely by 1665. In 1666, Louis XIV, on advice of Jean-Baptiste Colbert confirmed the earlier suppression.

The General Hospital and the Seminary of Foreign Missions continued to exist as legacies of this association, which Mazarin—and many historians who came after him—scornfully called the "Cabal of the Devout" (la cabale des dévôts).

== See also ==
- Secret society
- Gabriel Calloet-Kerbrat
