= Bossut =

Bossut is a surname. Notable people with the name include:

- Charles Bossut (1730–1814) French mathematician and confrère of the Encyclopaedists
- Sammy Bossut (born 1985), Belgian football goalkeeper

== See also ==
- Bossuet, surname
