= Bossuet =

Bossuet is a French surname. Notable people with the surname include:

- Jacques-Bénigne Bossuet (1627–1704), French bishop and theologian, uncle of Louis
- Louis Bossuet (1663–1742), French parliamentarian, nephew of Jacques-Bénigne

== See also ==
- Bossut, surname
- Musée Bossuet, art and history museum located in Meaux, France
