= Jacques de Solleysel =

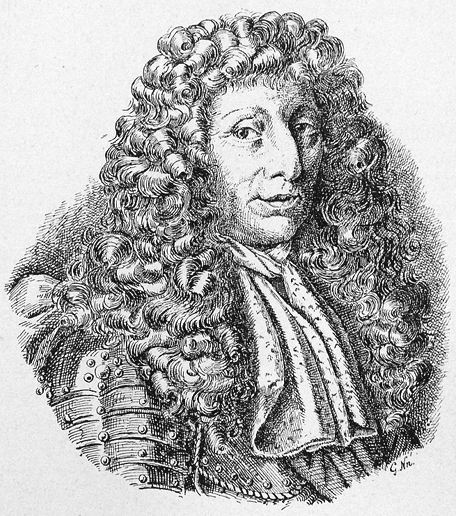
Jacques de Solleysel

Jacques Labessie de Solleysel (1617–1680) was a French author of books on horsemanship. In 1664 he published Le Parfait Maréschal (The Compleat horseman), "for more than 100 years the authoritative work on horses".

== Life ==
Jacques de Solleysel had studied at Lyon. One of his instructors in horsemanship was Menou de Charnizay, the friend and favourite pupil of Antoine de Pluvinel. He became Master of the Horse to the French Ambassador, negotiating the Peace of Westphalia at Münster in 1645, and using the opportunity to learn about veterinary practices in Germany. On his return to Paris he joined the Royal Riding Academy. He is said also to have had a talent for music, for painting, and for making friends.

Le Parfait Mareschal was in two volumes, the first on horse management and the second on equine diseases. The book showed familiarity with Greek and Latin writers on the subject. It also repeated extracts of Newcastle's book on horsemanship, on the grounds that Newcastle's book was hard to find and expensive. De Solleysel himself made a second French translation of Newcastle in 1677.

Sir William Hope abridged and translated the book into English as The Compleat Horseman' in 1696, and it was widely reprinted through the eighteenth century. George Washington owned a copy in his library.

== Works ==
- Le parfait maréchal : qui enseigne a connoître la beauté, la bonté et les défauts des chevaux, les signes & les causes des maladies, les moyens de les prévenir, leur guérison, le bon ou mauvais usage de la purgation & de la saignée ... : ensemble, un traité du haras pour élever de beaux & bons poulains..., 1664
  - Translated into English by Sir William Hope as The compleat horseman: discovering the surest marks of the beauty, goodness, faults and imperfections of horses, the signs and causes of their diseases, the true method both of their preservation and cure, with reflexions on the regular and preposterous use of bleeding and purging, 1696
- (tr.) Methode et invention nouvelle de dresser les chevaux by William Cavendish, 1st Duke of Newcastle, 1677
- Le mareschal methodique, qui traite des moyens de découvrir les défauts des chevaux, & de connoistre leurs maladies, 1676
