= Humphrey Bradley =

English land drainage engineer

- Died: before 1639
- Other names: Humfroy Bradley
- Occupation: land drainage engineer
- Title: Maître des digues du royaume
- Spouse: Anna Sermantens

Humphrey Bradley was an English land drainage engineer, active from about 1584 to 1625. He may have been the son of John Bradley of Bergen op Zoom in Brabant, then in the Dutch Republic, and Anna van der Delft.

Between 1584 and 1594 he was in England, where he worked on drainage projects on the Great Ouse, the Nene and the Witham rivers, prepared an analysis of the costs of improving the harbour at Dover, and submitted a proposal for draining the whole of the Fens. His manuscript Discourse of Humphry Bradley, a Brabanter, concerning the fens in Norfolk, Huntingdon, Cambridge, Northampton, and Lincolnshire is written in Italian and is dated 3 December 1589. Also in 1589, he married Anna Sermantens of Delft; their children Joachim and Sara were baptised at the Dutch Church in Austin Friars, in the City of London.

By 1596 he was in France, sent by the States-General of the Dutch Republic to assist Henri IV with land drainage for military purposes. On 1 January 1599 he was appointed maître des digues du royaume, or "master of dykes of the Kingdom", which essentially gave him a monopoly of all dyking and land reclamation work throughout the country. Early in the seventeenth century he contracted to drain parts of the Marais de Saintonge, but was not able to carry the work forward until after 1607, when the Société générale de desséchement des marais et lacs de France was formed by royal edict. Workers were brought from the Low Countries, and by about 1610 the area between Muron and Tonnay-Charente had come to be known as the Marais de la Petite-Flandre, the "marsh of little Flanders".

Bradley enjoyed the support of Maximilien de Béthune, Duke of Sully, the chief minister of Henri IV, and carried out substantial land reclamation work in Auvergne – the Marais de Sarliève in the Limagne – and in the Languedoc. A proposal for a canal from Dijon to Joigny, which would have connected the Saône to the Seine, and thus linked Marseille to Rouen, was not accepted.

The last documented mention of Bradley is from 1625; he is thought to have died before 1639.
